= Electric water boiler =

Consumer electronics appliance

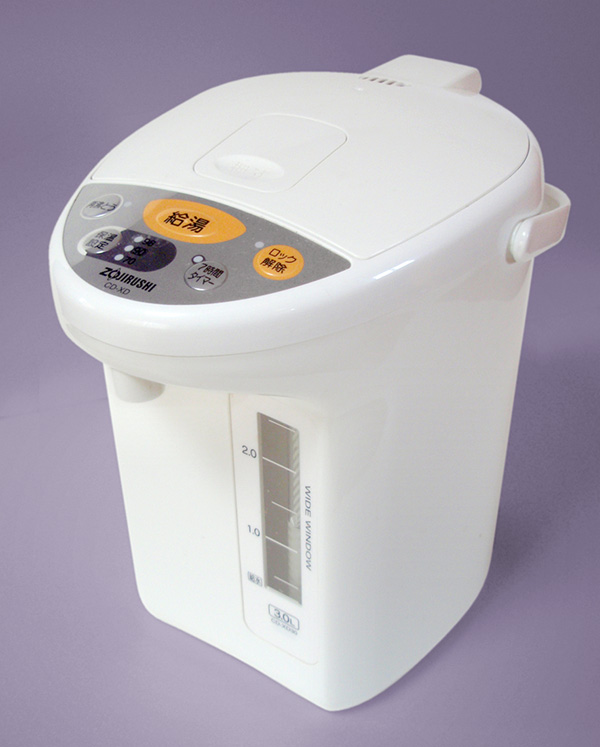
Japanese Zojirushi brand "Thermo Pot" electric kettle hot water dispenser

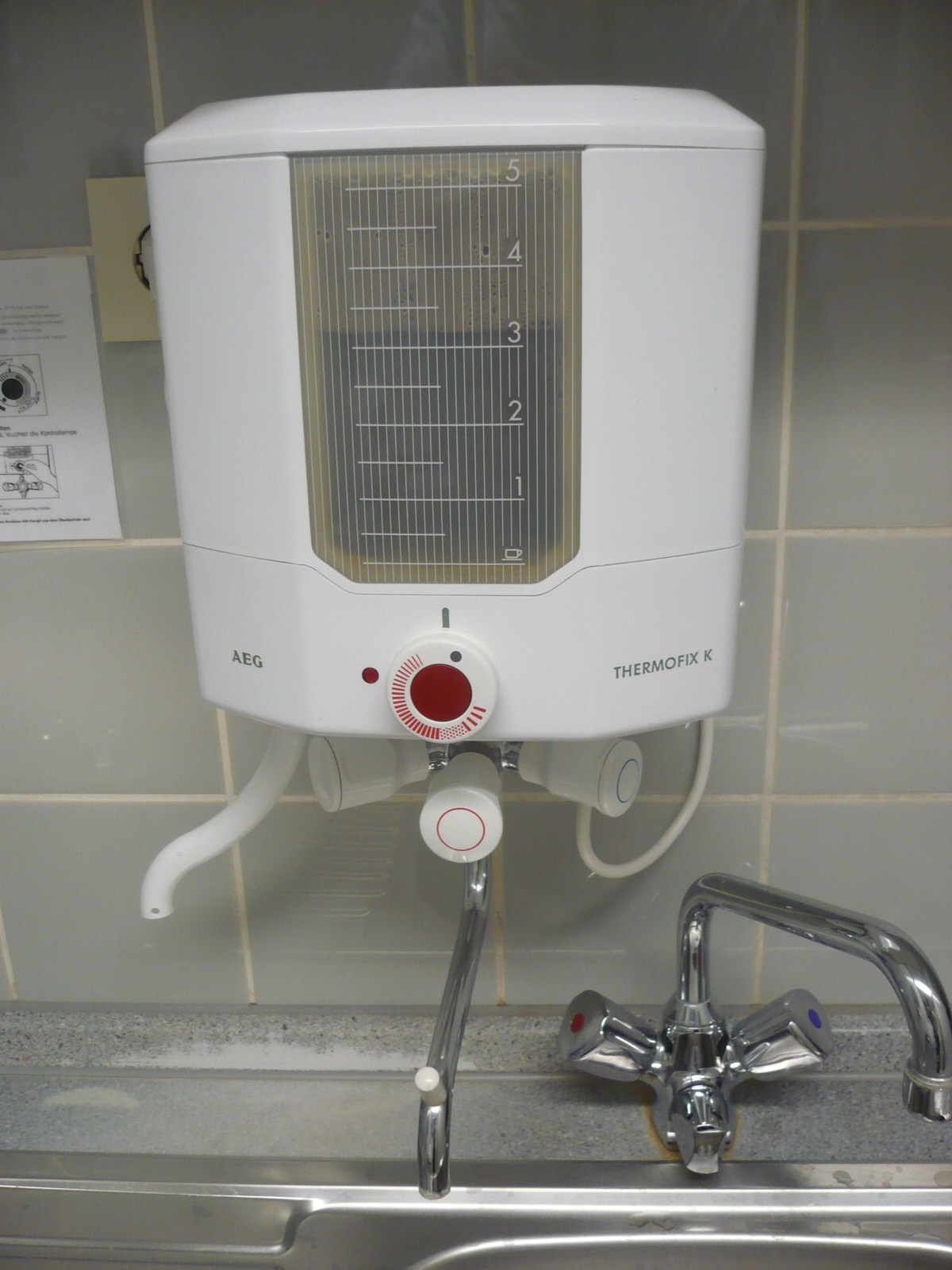
Wall mounted, unpressurized electric boiler with 5 liters maximum capacity

An electric water boiler, also called a thermo pot, is a consumer electronics small appliance used for boiling water and maintaining it at a constant temperature in an enclosed reservoir. It is typically used to provide an immediate source of hot water for making tea, hot chocolate, coffee, instant noodles, or baby formula, or for any other household use where clean hot water is required. They are a common component of Japanese kitchens and the kitchens of many East Asian countries, but are found in varying use globally. Smaller units are portable. Some thermo pots are designed with a feature that can purify water.

== Components ==
An electric water boiler is a device comprising a water reservoir equipped with a heating element positioned at the bottom. While some models offer the convenience of multiple temperature settings, others are integrated into larger water systems capable of boiling water and dispensing it in various forms: hot, cold, or tepid. Dispensing methods vary and can include pouring, utilizing an electric pump, or pressing a large button that acts as a diaphragm pump. Additionally, electric water boilers are typically equipped with an automatic shutoff to prevent boiling away all water and overheating.

== Sedimentation ==
Sedimentation refers to the gradual accumulation of natural minerals within the water reservoir, typically found in trace amounts in municipal water mains. These minerals, predominantly calcium carbonate, tend to settle at the bottom of the reservoir as the water is heated. Over time, this sediment buildup can lead to several issues. Firstly, it can generate various noises within gas boilers due to the disturbance caused by the sediment. Additionally, the accumulation can impair the efficiency of the unit, as the sediment acts as an insulating layer, hindering the transfer of heat. Moreover, the presence of sediment can result in the development of an unpleasant sulfur or rotten-egg smell in the water.

To address sediment buildup in electric water boilers, descaling agents such as vinegar or citric acid are commonly used. These substances effectively dissolve and remove the accumulated minerals, restoring the boiler's performance and eliminating any associated odors.

== Uses ==
Some electric water boiler models enable tea to be steeped at a desired, adjustable temperature.

== See also ==
- Samovar
- Water dispenser
  - Instant hot water dispenser
- Electric kettle
- Electric steam boiler
- Immersion heater
- Thermoelectricity
- Joule heating
