= Electric heating =

Process in which electrical energy is converted to heat

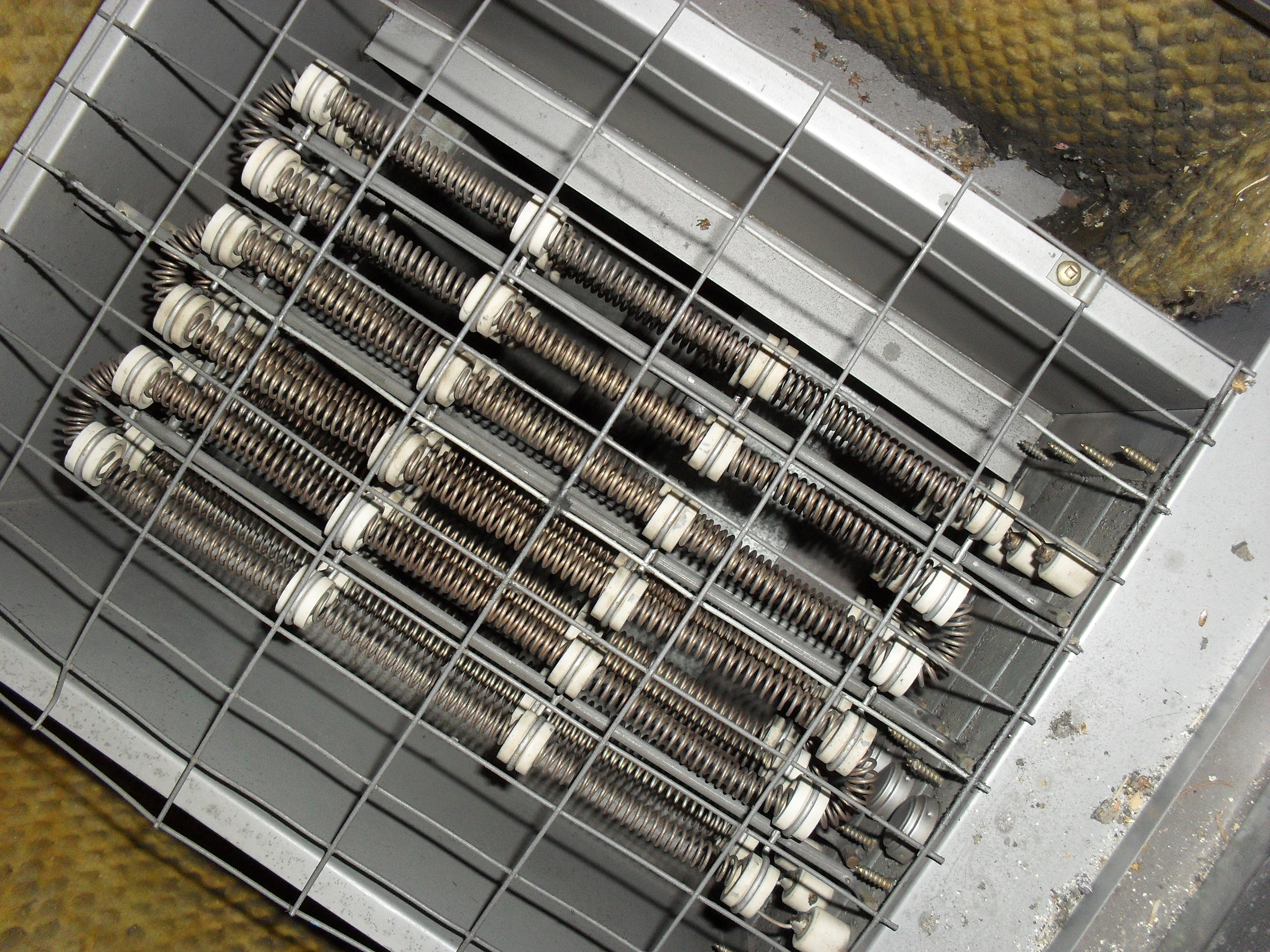
30-kW resistance heating coils

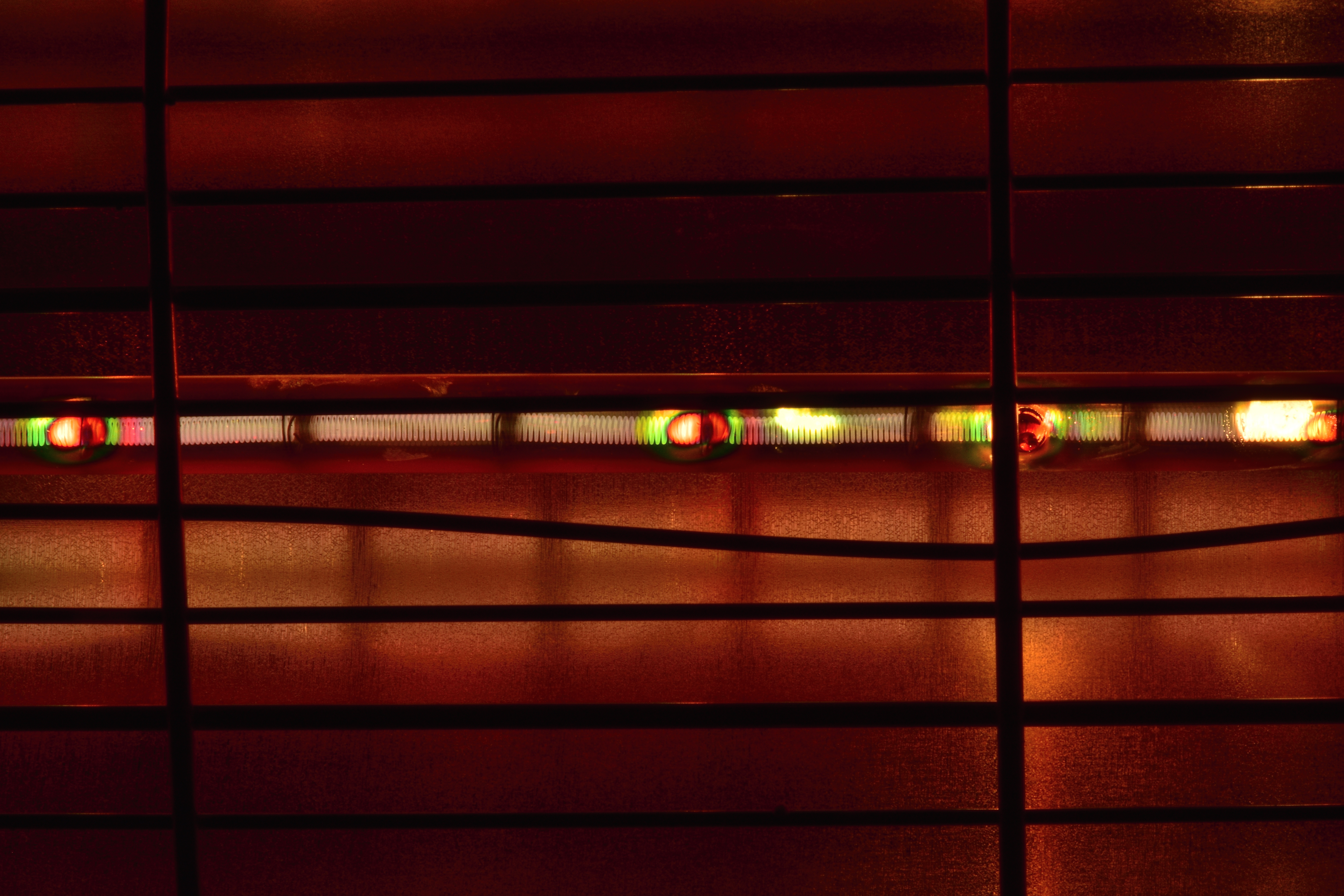
This radiant heater uses tungsten halogen lamps.

Electric heating is a process in which electrical energy is converted directly to heat energy. Common applications include space heating, cooking, water heating and industrial processes. An electric heater is an electrical device that converts an electric current into heat. The heating element inside every electric heater is an electrical resistor, and works on the principle of Joule heating: an electric current passing through a resistor will convert that electrical energy into heat energy. Most modern electric heating devices use nichrome wire as the active element; the heating element, depicted on the right, uses nichrome wire supported by ceramic insulators.

Alternatively, a heat pump can achieve around 150% – 600% efficiency for heating, or COP 1.5 - 6.0 Coefficient of performance, because it uses electric power only for transferring existing thermal energy. The heat pump uses an electric motor to drive a reversed refrigeration cycle that draws heat energy from an external source such as the ground or outside air (or the interior of a refrigerator) and directs that heat into the space to be warmed (in case of a fridge, the kitchen). This makes much better use of electric energy than direct electric heating, but requires much more expensive equipment, plus plumbing. Some heating systems can be operated in reverse for air conditioning so that the interior space is cooled and even hotter air or water is discharged outside or into the ground.

== Space heating ==
Space heating is used to warm the interiors of buildings. Space heaters are useful in places where air-handling is difficult, such as in laboratories. Several methods of electric space heating are used.

=== Infrared radiant heaters ===
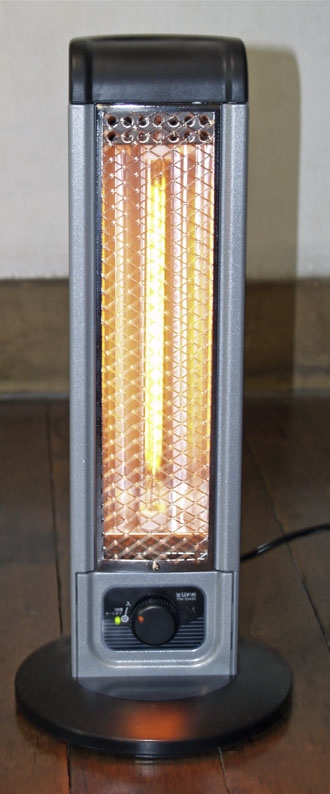
An electric radiative space heater

Electric infrared radiant heating uses heating elements that reach a high temperature. The element is usually packaged inside a glass envelope resembling a light bulb and with a reflector to direct the energy output away from the body of the heater. The element emits infrared radiation that travels through air or space until it hits an absorbing surface, where it is partially converted to heat and partially reflected. This heat directly warms people and objects in the room, rather than warming the air. This style of heater is particularly useful in areas through which unheated air flows. They are also ideal for basements and garages where spot heating is desired. More generally, they are an excellent choice for task-specific heating.

Radiant heaters operate silently and present the greatest potential danger of ignition of nearby furnishings due to the focused intensity of their output and lack of overheat protection. In the United Kingdom, these appliances are sometimes called electric fires, because they were originally used to replace open fires.

The active medium of the heater depicted in this section is a coil of nichrome resistance wire inside a fused silica tube, open to the atmosphere at the ends, although models exist where the fused silica is sealed at the ends and the resistance alloy is not nichrome.

=== Convection heaters ===
==== Natural convection ====
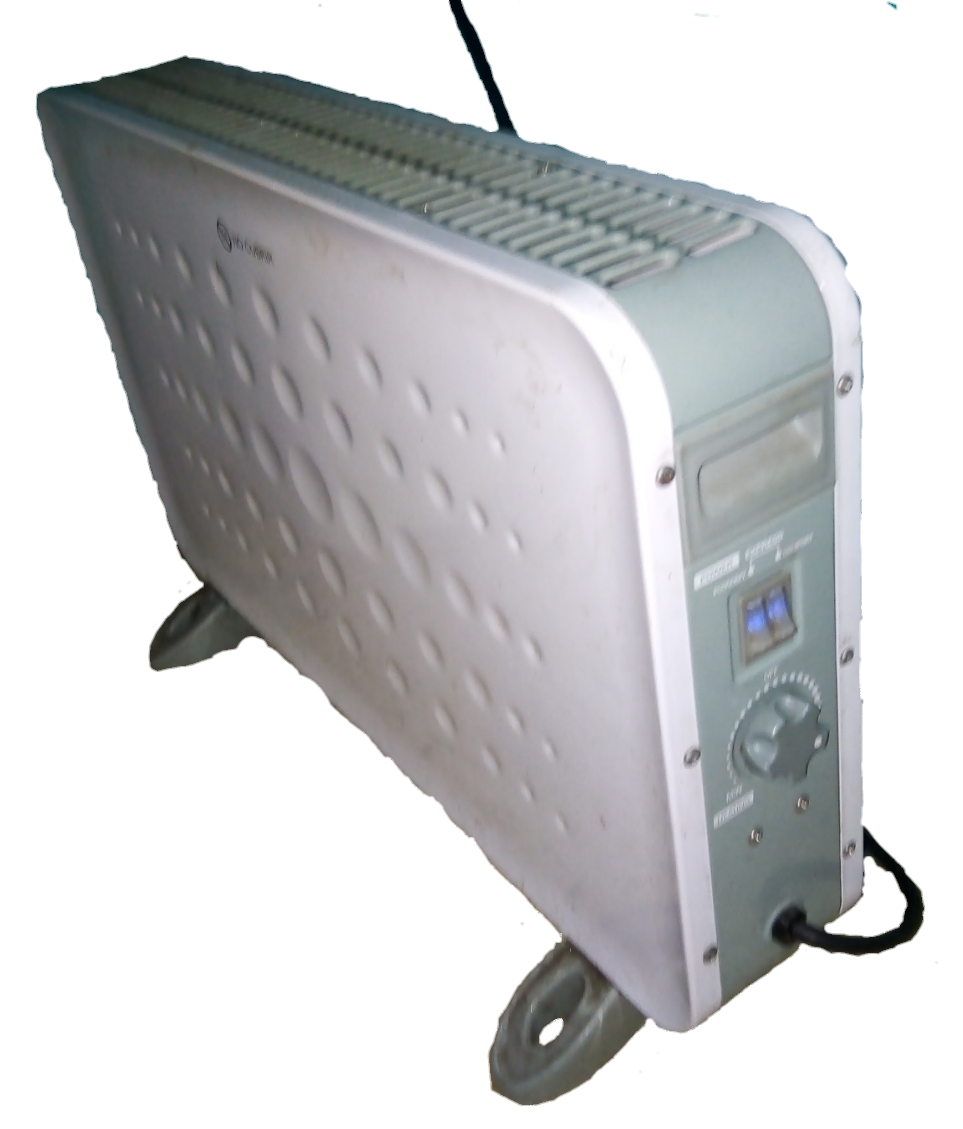
An electric convection heater

In a convection heater, the heating element heats the air in contact with it by thermal conduction. Hot air is less dense than cool air, so it rises due to buoyancy, allowing more cool air to flow in to take its place. This sets up a convection current of hot air that rises from the heater, heats up the surrounding space, cools and then repeats the cycle. These heaters are sometimes filled with oil or thermal fluid. They are ideally suited for heating a closed space. They operate silently and have a lower risk of ignition hazard if they make unintended contact with furnishings compared to radiant electric heaters.

==== Forced convection ====
A fan heater, also called a forced convection heater, is a kind of convection heater that includes an electric fan to speed up the airflow. They operate with considerable noise caused by the fan. They have a moderate risk of ignition hazard if they make unintended contact with furnishings. Their advantage is that they are more compact than heaters that use natural convection and are also cost-efficient for portable and small room heating systems.

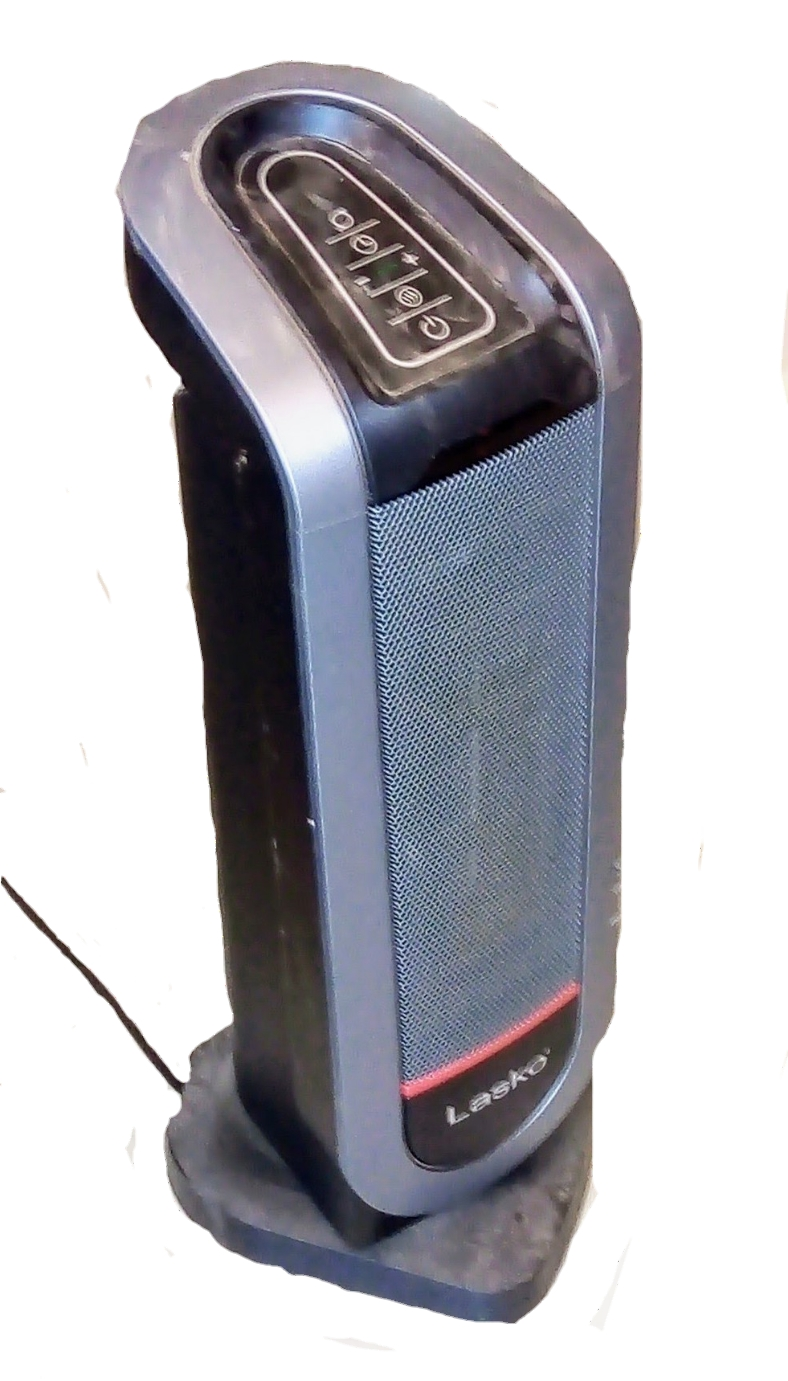
Tower fan heater

=== Storage heating ===
A storage heating system takes advantage of cheaper electricity prices, sold during low demand periods such as overnight. In the United Kingdom, this is branded as Economy 7. The storage heater stores heat in clay bricks, then releases it during the day when required. Newer storage heaters are able to be used with various tariffs. Whilst they can still be used with economy 7, they can be used with day-time tariffs. This is due to the modern design features that are added during manufacturing. Alongside new designs the use of a thermostat or sensor has improved the efficiency of the storage heater. A thermostat or sensor is able to read the temperature of the room, and change the output of the heater accordingly.

Water can also be used as a heat-storage medium.

=== Domestic electrical underfloor heating ===
An electric underfloor heating system has heating cables embedded in the floor. Current flows through a conductive heating material, supplied either directly from the line voltage (120 or 240 volts) or at low voltage from a transformer. The heated cables warm the flooring by direct conduction and will switch off once it reaches the temperature set by the floor thermostat. A warmer floor surface radiates heat to colder surrounding surfaces (ceiling, walls, furniture.) which absorb heat and reflects all non absorbed heat to yet other still cooler surfaces. The cycle of radiation, absorption and reflection starts slowly and slows down slowly nearing set point temperatures and ceases to take place once equilibrium is reached all-round. A floor thermostat or a room thermostat or combination controls the floor on/off. In the process of radiant heating a thin layer of air which is in touch with the warmed surfaces also absorbs some heat and this creates a little convection (air circulation). Contrary to belief people are not heated by this warmed circulating air or convection (convection has a cooling effect) but are heated by the direct radiation of the source and reflection of its surrounds. Comfort is reached at lower air temperature due to eliminating circulating air. Radiant heating experiences highest comfort levels as people's own energy (± 70 Watt for an adult) (must radiate out in heating season) is in balance with its surrounds. Compared to convection heating system based on academic research the air temperatures may be lowered by up to 3 degrees. One variation is using tubes filled with circulating hot water as heat source for warming the floor. The heating principle remains the same. Both old style electric and warm water (hydronic) underfloor heating systems embedded in the floor construction are slow and cannot respond to external weather changes or internal demand/lifestyle requirements. The latest variant places specialized electric heating systems and blankets directly under the floor-decor and on top of additional insulation all placed on top of construction floors. Construction floors stay cold. The principle change of heat source positioning allows it to respond within minutes to changing weather and internal demand requirements such as life style being in/out, at work, rest, sleep, more people present/cooking, etc.

=== Lighting system ===
In large office towers, the lighting system is integrated along with the heating and ventilation system. Waste heat from fluorescent lamps is captured in the return air of the heating system; in large buildings a substantial part of the annual heating energy is supplied by the lighting system. However, this waste heat becomes a liability when using air conditioning. Such expenses can be avoided by integrating an energy efficient lighting system that also creates an electric heat source.

=== Heat pumps ===
A heat pump uses an electrically driven compressor to operate a refrigeration cycle that extracts heat energy from outdoor air, the ground or ground water, and moves that heat to the space to be warmed. A liquid contained within the evaporator section of the heat pump boils at low pressure, absorbing heat energy from the outdoor air or the ground. The vapor is then compressed by a compressor and piped into a condenser coil within the building to be heated. The heat from the hot dense gas is absorbed by the air in the building (and sometimes also used for domestic hot water) causing the hot working fluid to condense back into a liquid. From there the high pressure fluid is passed back to the evaporator section where it expands through an orifice and into the evaporator section, completing the cycle. In the summer months, the cycle can be reversed to move heat out of the conditioned space and to the outside air.

Heat pumps may obtain low-grade heat from the outdoor air in mild climates. In areas with average winter temperatures well below freezing, ground source heat pumps are more efficient than air source heat pumps because they can extract residual solar heat stored in the ground at warmer temperatures than is available from cold air. According to the US EPA, geothermal heat pumps can reduce energy consumption up to 44% compared with air source heat pumps and up to 72% compared with electric resistance heating. The high purchase price of a heat pump vs resistance heaters may be offset when air conditioning is also needed.

== Liquid heating ==
=== Immersion heater ===
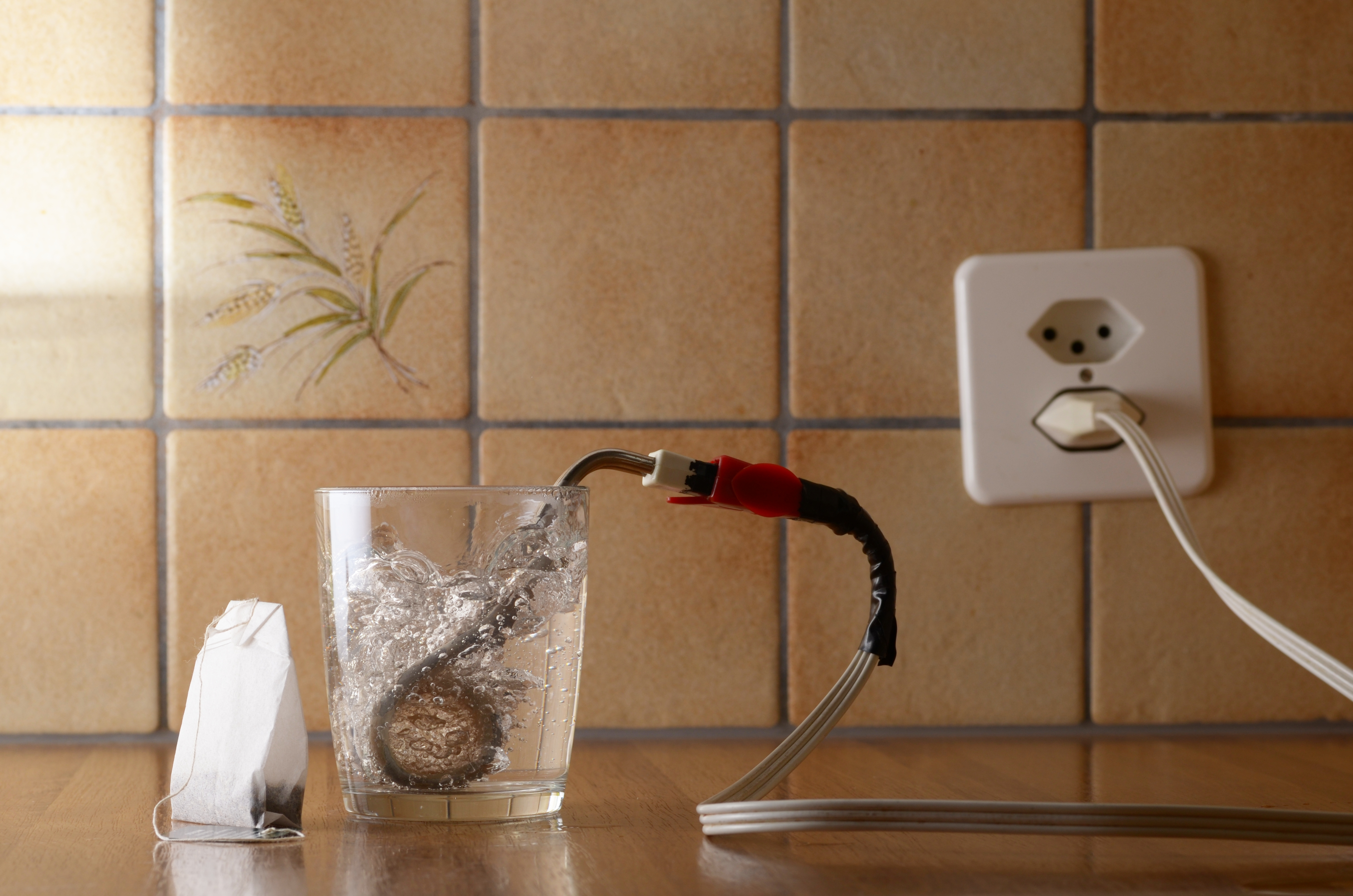
Small domestic immersion heater, 500 W

An immersion heater has an electrical resistance heating element encased in a tube, placed in the water (or other fluid) to be heated. The heating element might be inserted directly into the liquid, or installed inside a metal pipe to protect against corrosion and facilitate maintenance. Portable immersion heaters may not have a control thermostat, since they are intended to be used only briefly and under control of an operator.

For domestic hot water supply, or industrial process hot water, permanently installed heating elements in an insulated hot water tank may be used, controlled by a thermostat to regulate temperature. Household units may be rated only a few kilowatts. Industrial water heaters may reach 2000 kilowatts. Where off-peak electric power rates are available, hot water may be stored to use when required.

Minerals present in the water supply may precipitate out of solution and form a hard scale on the heating element surface, or may fall to the bottom of the tank and clog water flow. Maintenance of water heating equipment may require periodic removal of accumulated scale and sediment. Where water supplies are known to be highly mineralized, scale production can be reduced by using low-watt-density heating elements.

==== Electric shower ====
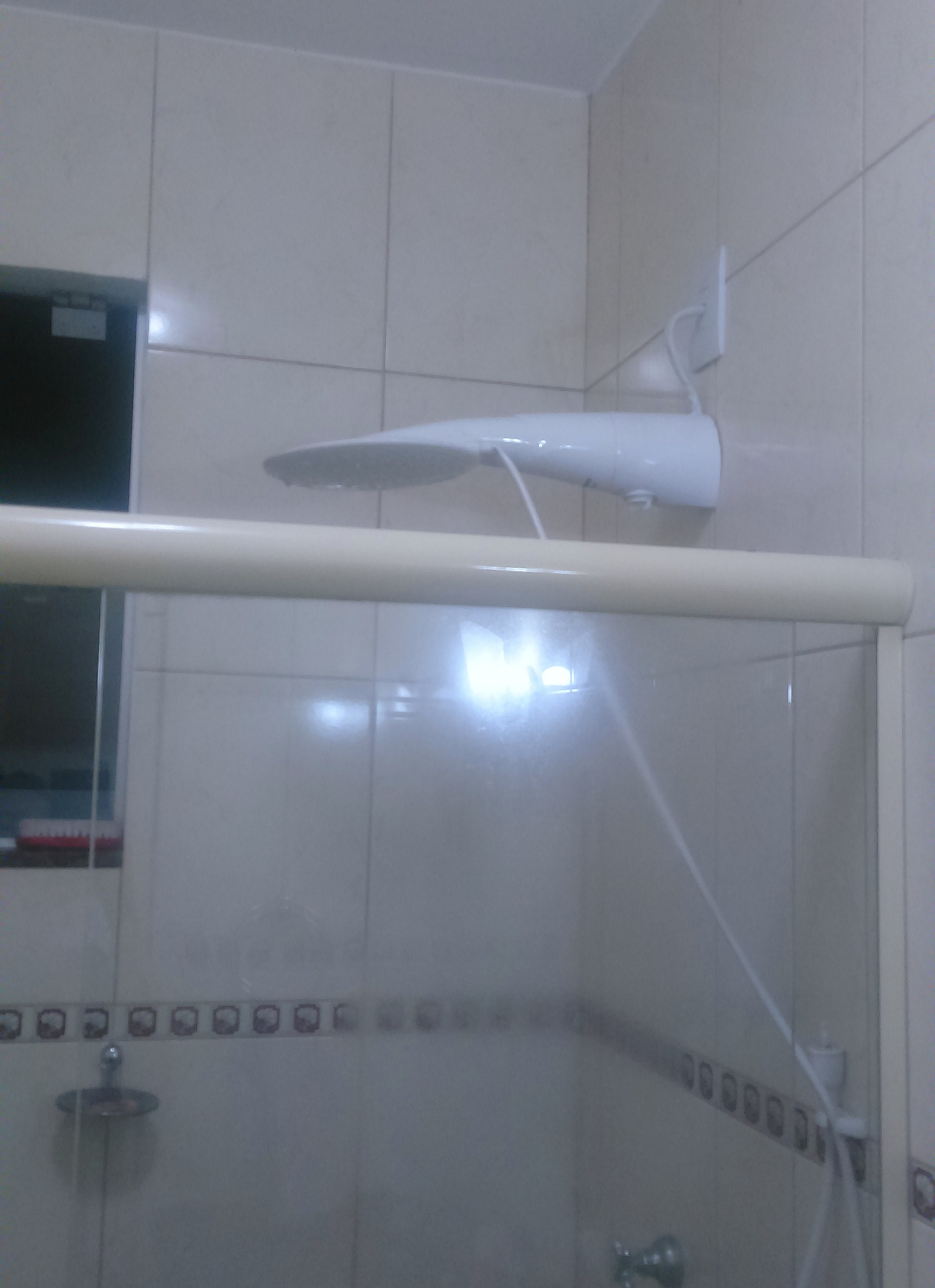
Electric shower

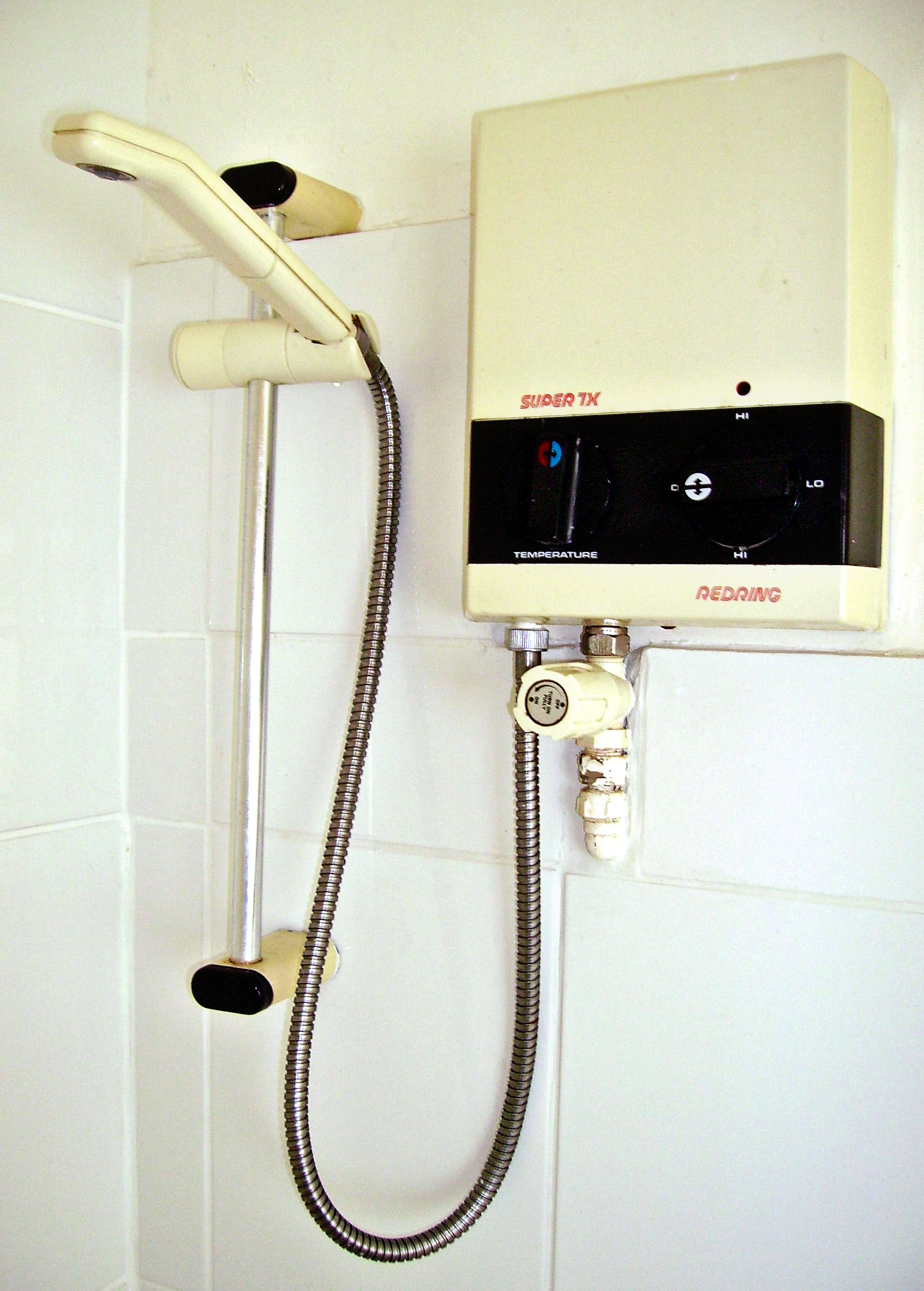
In the UK

An electric shower or electric shower head are self-heating shower heads that use an immersion heater which is turned on with the flow of water. A group of separate electric heating elements can be switched to offer different heating levels or with an electronic temperature control (using hi-power dimmer). They are specialized point-of-use tankless water heaters and are widely used in some countries such as Brazil and to a lesser extent in Central America. In some countries such as the UK, Malaysia and the Philippines, a tankless electric heater can be placed directly in the shower wall.

Invented in Brazil by Francisco Canhos in the 1930s due to a lack of central gas distribution and used frequently since the 1940s, the electric shower is a home appliance often seen in South and Central American countries due to the higher costs of gas distribution, combined with households that in most cases do not support conventional water heaters, as they do not have dedicated hot water piping. Earlier models were made of chromed copper or brass, which were expensive and carried an electric shock risk due to the metallic exterior, but since 1970, units made of injected plastics are popular due to low prices similar to that of a hair dryer.

Electric showers have a simple electric system, working like a coffee maker, but with a larger water flow. A pressure switch turns on the device when enough water flows through it, pressurizing the interior. Once the water is stopped, the device turns off automatically. An ordinary electric shower often but not always has three heat settings: high for winter (5.5 kW), low for summer (2.5 kW), or cold (0 W) to use when a central heater system is available or in hot seasons. Higher power (up to 7.5 KW) and lower power (up to 3.2 KW) versions are also made, as well as versions with 4 heat settings or a variable heat setting controlled by a semiconductor device such as a triac, and a dial or stick that is rotated by the user.

==== Electric water boiler ====
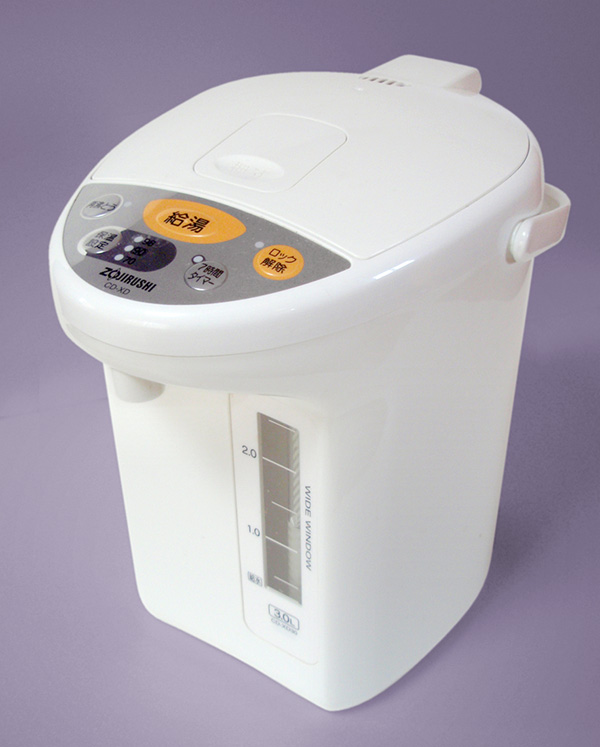
Japanese Zojirushi brand "Thermo Pot" electric kettle hot water dispenser

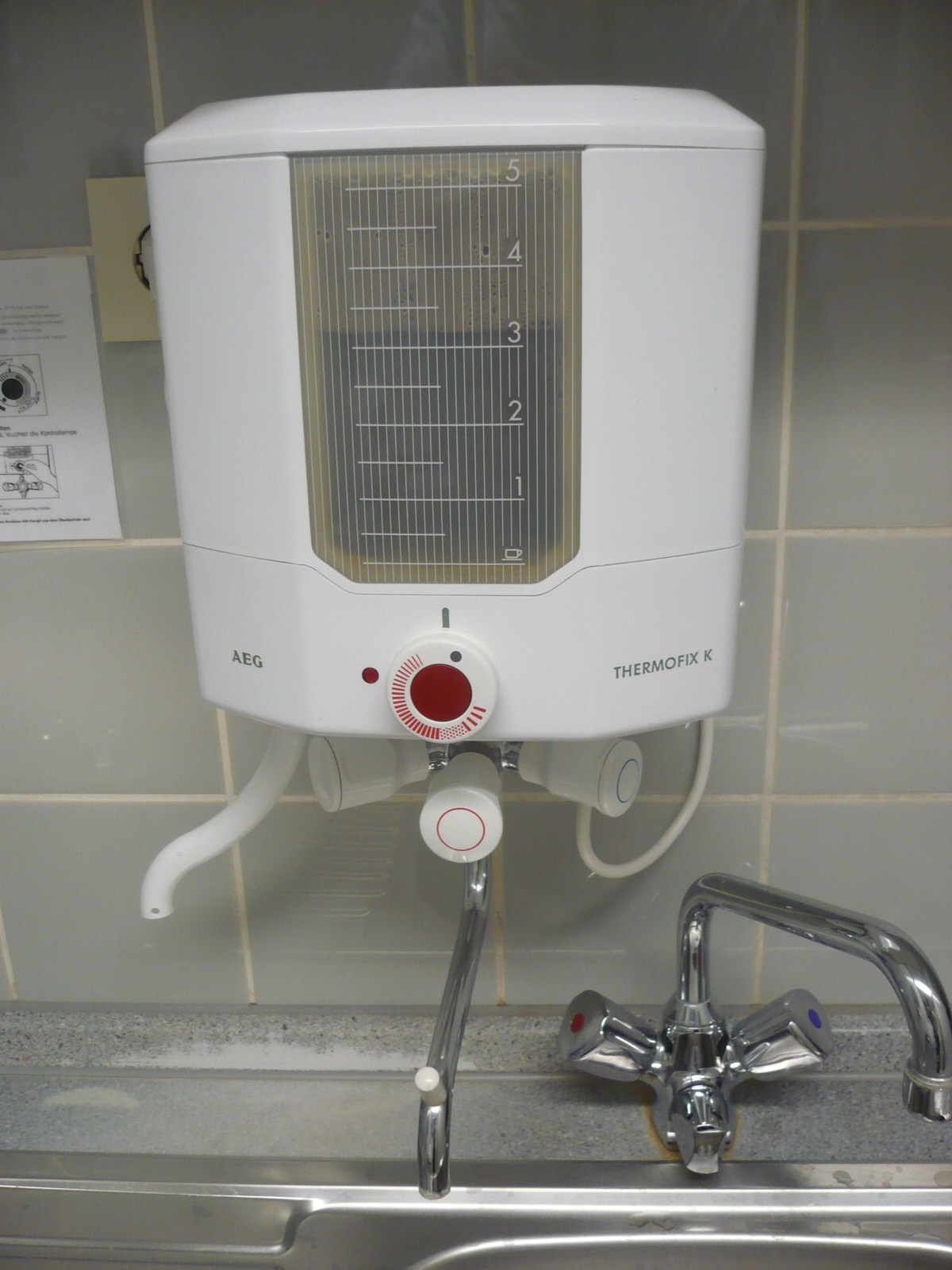
Wall mounted, unpressurized electric boiler with 5 liters maximum capacity

An electric water boiler, also called a thermo pot, is a consumer electronics small appliance used for boiling water and maintaining it at a constant temperature in an enclosed reservoir. It is typically used to provide an immediate source of hot water for making tea, hot chocolate, coffee, instant noodles, or baby formula, or for any other household use where clean hot water is required. They are a common component of Japanese kitchens and the kitchens of many East Asian countries, but are found in varying use globally. Smaller units are portable. Some thermo pots are designed with a feature that can purify water.

=== Circulation heaters ===
Circulation heaters or "direct electric heat exchangers" (DEHE) use heating elements inserted into a "shell side" medium directly to provide the heating effect. All of the heat generated by the electric circulation heater is transferred into the medium, thus an electric heater is 100 percent efficient. Direct electric heat exchangers or "circulation heaters" are used to heat liquids and gases in industrial processes.

=== Electrode heater ===
With an electrode heater, there is no wire-wound resistance and the liquid itself acts as the resistance. This has potential hazards, so the regulations governing electrode heaters are strict.

== Environmental and efficiency aspects ==
The efficiency of any system depends on the definition of the boundaries of the system. For an electrical energy customer the efficiency of electric space heating is 100% because all purchased energy is converted to heat. However, if a power plant supplying electricity is included, the overall efficiency drops drastically. For example, a fossil-fuel power station only delivers 3-5 units of electrical energy for every 10 units of fuel energy released. Even though the electric heater is 100% efficient, the amount of fuel needed to produce the heat is more than if the fuel were burned in a furnace or boiler at the building being heated. If the same fuel could be used for space heating by a consumer, it would be more efficient overall to burn the fuel at the end user's building. On the other hand, replacing electric heating with fossil fuel burning heaters, isn't necessarily good as it removes the ability to have renewable electric heating, this can be achieved by sourcing the electricity from a renewable source.

Variations between countries generating electrical power affect concerns about efficiency and the environment. In 2015 France generated only 6% of its electricity from fossil fuels, while Australia sourced over 86% of its electricity from fossil fuels. The cleanliness and efficiency of electricity are dependent on the source.

In Sweden the use of direct electric heating has been restricted since the 1980s for this reason, and there are plans to phase it out entirely – see Oil phase-out in Sweden – while Denmark has banned the installation of direct electric space heating in new buildings for similar reasons. In the case of new buildings, low-energy building techniques can be used which can virtually eliminate the need for heating, such as those built to the Passivhaus standard.

In Quebec, however, electric heating is still the most popular form of home heating. According to a 2003 Statistics Canada survey, 68% of households in the province use electricity for space heating. More than 90% of all power consumed in Quebec is generated by hydroelectric dams, which have low greenhouse gases emissions compared to fossil-fuel power stations. Low and stable rates are charged by Hydro-Québec, the provincially owned utility.

In recent years there has been a major trend for countries to generate low-carbon electricity from renewable sources, adding to nuclear power and hydro-electric power which are long-standing low-carbon sources. For example, the carbon footprint of UK electricity per kWh in 2019 was less than half that in 2010. However, because of high capital cost, the cost of electricity has not fallen and is typically 2-3 times that of burning fuel. Hence, direct electric heating may now give a similar carbon footprint to gas- or oil-fired heating, but the cost remains higher, though cheaper off-peak tariffs can reduce this effect.

To provide heat more efficiently, an electrically driven heat pump can raise the indoor temperature by extracting energy from the ground, the outside air, or waste streams such as exhaust air. This can cut the electricity consumption to as little as 35% of that used by resistive heating. Where the primary source of electrical energy is hydroelectric, nuclear, or wind, transferring electricity via the grid can be convenient, since the resource may be too distant for direct heating applications (with the notable exception of solar thermal energy).

The electrification of heat of space and water heating is increasingly proposed as a way forward to decarbonise the current energy system, particularly with heat pumps. In case of large-scale electrification, impacts on the electricity grid due to potential increase in peak electricity demand and exposure to extreme weather events needs to be considered.

== Economic aspects ==
The operation of electric resistance heaters to heat an area for long periods is costly in many regions. However, intermittent or partial day use can be more cost efficient than whole building heating due to superior zonal control.

For example: A lunch room in an office setting has limited hours of operation. During low-use periods a "monitor" level of heat (50 °F or 10 °C) is provided by the central heating system. Peak use times between the hours of 11:00 and 14:00 are heated to "comfort levels" (70 °F or 21 °C). Significant savings can be realized in overall energy consumption, since infrared radiation losses through thermal radiation are not as large with a smaller temperature gradient both between this space and unheated outside air, as well as between the refrigerator and the (now cooler) lunch room.

Economically, electric heat can be compared to other sources of home heating by multiplying the local cost per kilowatt hour for electricity by the number of kilowatts the heater uses. E.g.: 1500-watt heater at 12 cents per kilowatt hour 1.5×12=18 cents per hour. When comparing to burning fuel it may be useful to convert kilowatt hours to BTUs: 1.5 kWh × 3412.142=5118 BTU.

== Industrial applications ==
Electric heating is widely used in industry.

Advantages of electric heating methods over other forms include precision control of temperature and distribution of heat energy, combustion not used to develop heat, and the ability to attain temperatures not readily achievable with chemical combustion. Electric heat can be accurately applied at the precise point needed in a process, at high concentration of power per unit area or volume. Electric heating devices can be built in any required size and can be located anywhere within a plant. Electric heating processes are generally clean, quiet, and do not emit much byproduct heat to the surroundings. Electrical heating equipment has a high speed of response, lending it to rapid-cycling mass-production equipment.

The limitations and disadvantages of electric heating in industry include the higher cost of electrical energy compared to direct use of fuel, and the capital cost of both the electric heating apparatus itself and the infrastructure required to deliver large quantities of electrical energy to the point of use. This may be somewhat offset by in-plant (on-site) efficiency gains in using less energy overall to achieve the same result.

Design of an industrial heating system starts with assessment of the temperature required, the amount of heat required, and the feasible modes of transferring heat energy. In addition to conduction, convection and radiation, electrical heating methods can use electric and magnetic fields to heat material.

Methods of electric heating include resistance heating, electric arc heating, induction heating, and dielectric heating. In some processes (for example, arc welding), electric current is directly applied to the workpiece. In other processes, heat is produced within the workpiece by induction or dielectric losses. As well, heat can be produced then transferred to the work by conduction, convection or radiation.

Industrial heating processes can be broadly categorized as low-temperature (to about 400 °C or 752 °F), medium-temperature (between 400 and 1,150 °C or 752 and 2,102 °F), and high-temperature (beyond 1,150 °C or 2,102 °F). Low-temperature processes include baking and drying, curing finishes, soldering, molding and shaping plastics. Medium temperature processes include melting plastics and some non-metals for casting or reshaping, as well as annealing, stress-relieving and heat-treating metals. High-temperature processes include steelmaking, brazing, welding, casting metals, cutting, smelting and the preparation of some chemicals.

== See also ==
- Auxiliary power unit
- Central heating
- Diathermy
- Dielectric heating
- Electroslag welding
- Electroslag remelting
- Energy conservation
- Head-end power
- Heater (types of heaters)
- Heating, ventilation, and air conditioning
- Hotel electric power
- Infrared heater
- Microwave oven
- Renewable energy
- Thermal efficiency
- Thermal immersion circulator
- Underfloor heating
