= Instant hot water dispenser =

Appliance that provides hot water

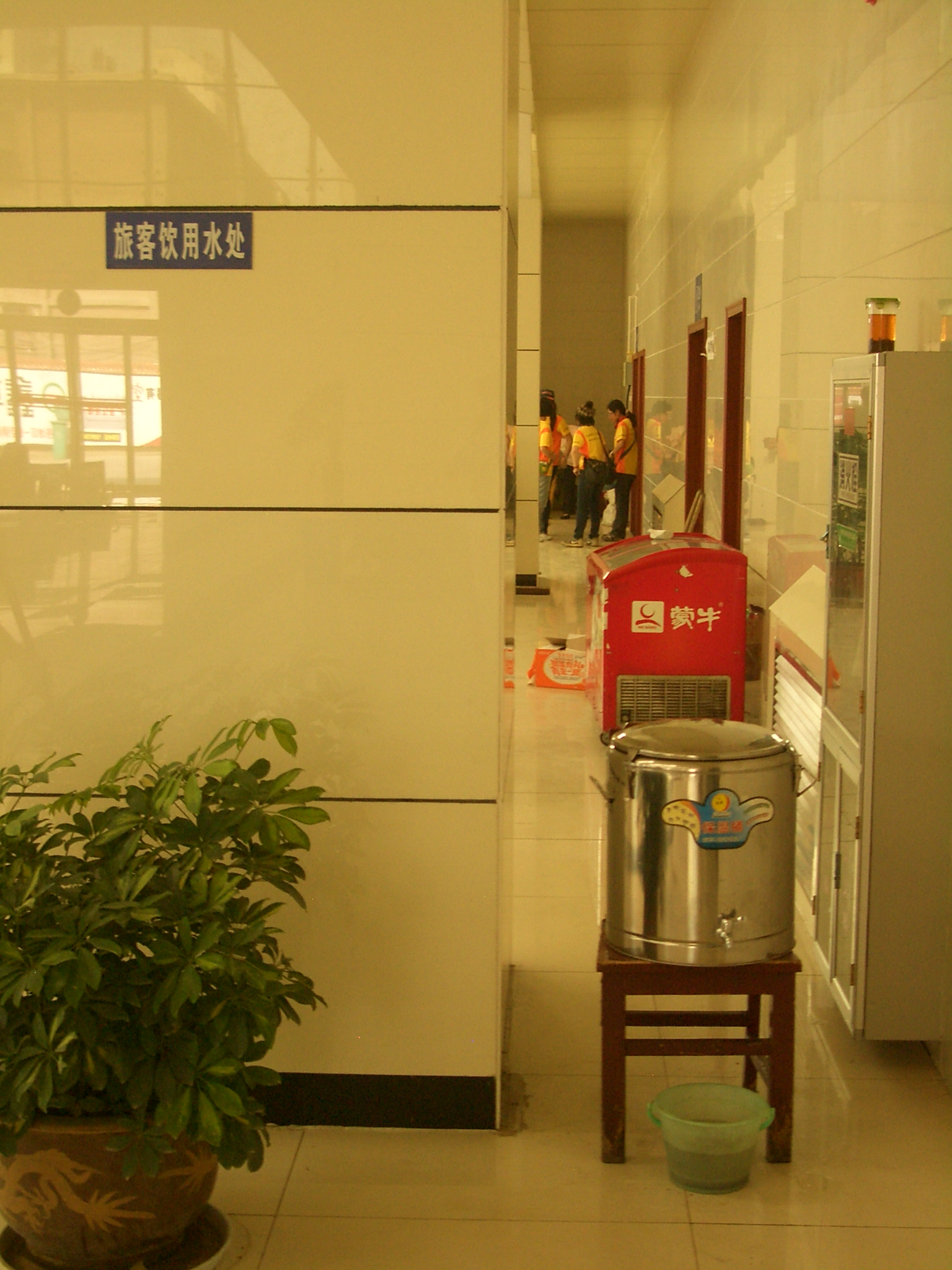
Hot water dispenser at Lanzhou Bus Station, China, providing free boiling water to make a cup of tea or a bowl of instant noodles

An instant hot water dispenser or boiling water tap is an appliance that dispenses water at near-boiling temperatures. There are hot-only and hot-and-cool water models, and the water may be filtered as well as heated. Instant hot water dispensers became popular in the 1970s. Instant hot water dispensers are very similar to portable shower devices; the latter are fitted with a heating element and quickly heat water once a switch is activated.

== Types ==
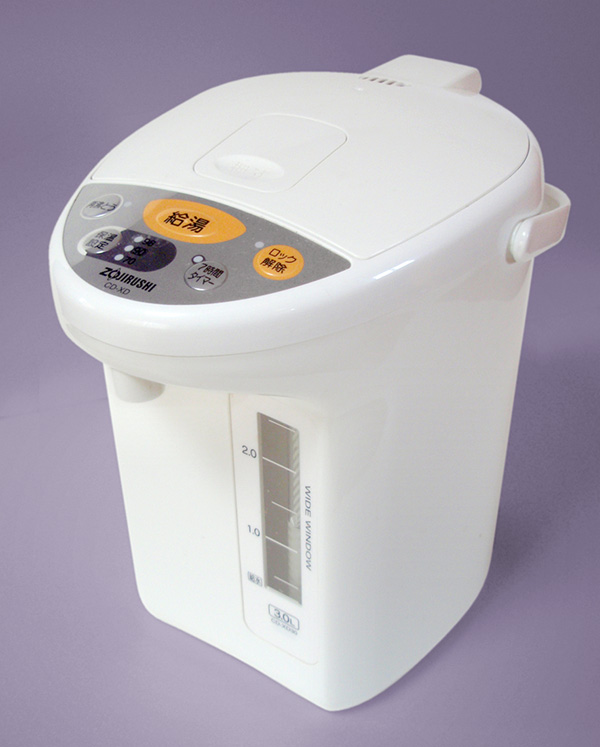
Japanese Zojirushi brand "Thermo Pot" electric kettle hot water dispenser

=== Boil-on-demand ===
Such instant hot water dispensers consist of a heater and can boil a small amount of water very quickly. They are usually small and portable, and unlike regular dispensers, they do not have a separate hot-water tank. While this reduces power consumption, such dispensers are not suitable for heating large quantities of water and often require refilling.

=== Hot water tank dispensers ===
Plumbed directly into the water supply and heated in an under-sink or over-counter tank (fixed to the wall); hot water is dispensed through a faucet at the sink. They may have a built-in water filter and a thermostat to adjust the water temperature. There is no need to fill them; they can produce large amounts of hot water. The water temperature is adjustable; they are expensive, require plumbing work, are not portable, and waste electricity keeping the water hot at all times.

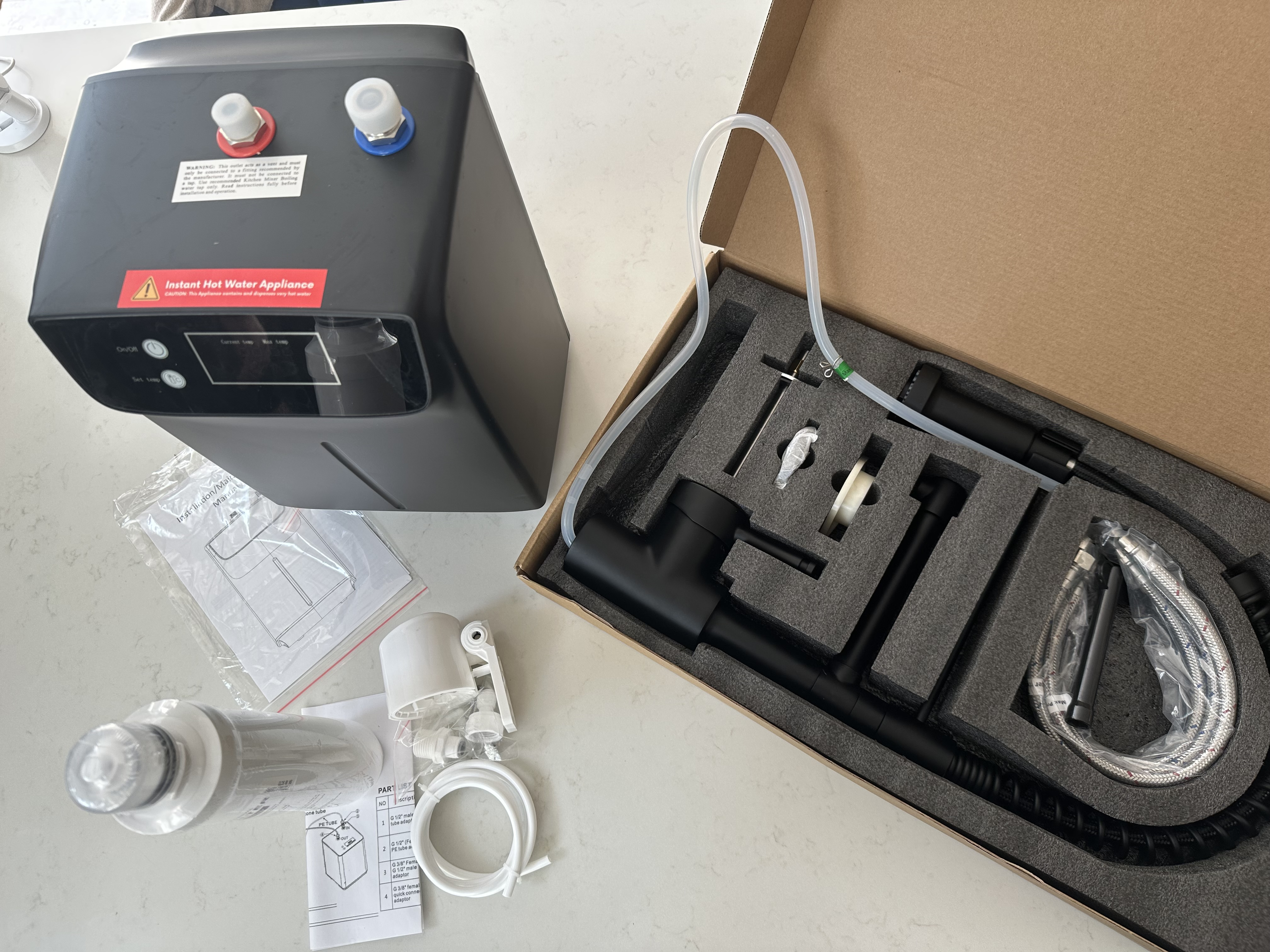
Under-sink hot water boiling unit, carbon water filter and boiling water tap unit.

=== Thermo pot electric kettle hot water dispensers ===
A combination of an electric kettle and a hot water flask; water is heated in the pot and left in the insulated pot ready to be pumped out by a built-in electric pump or a manual push-down pump. They do not need to be installed, are portable, may have adjustable temperature settings, need to be refilled (typically 3 to 5 L (0.79 to 1.32 US gal)), and waste electricity keeping water hot at all times.

=== Bottom load water dispenser ===
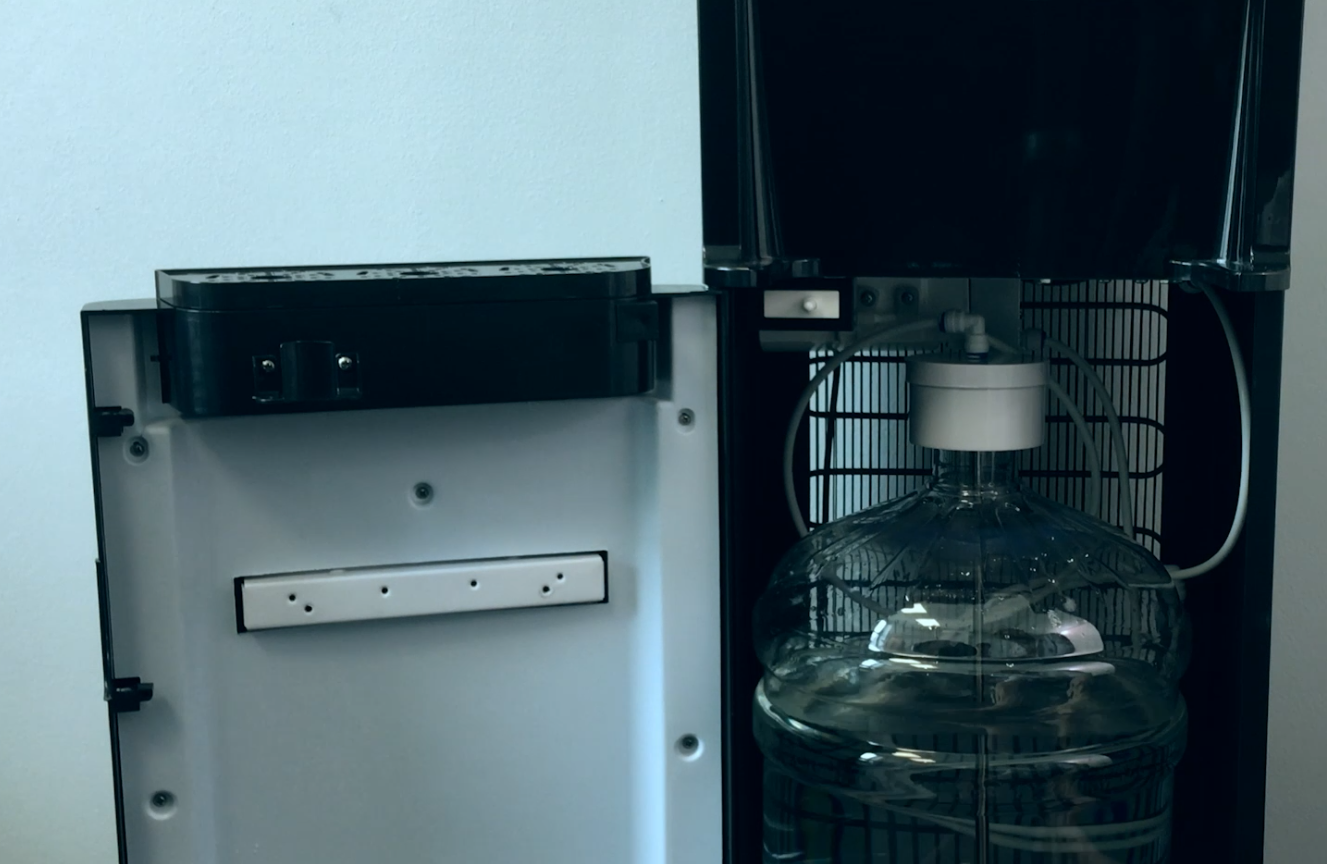
Bottom load water dispenser revealing a 19 L (5 US gal) bottle with cabinet opened.

A special dispenser in which the water bottle is placed at the bottom. This is very convenient as the bottle does not have to be lifted up and placed upside down.

=== Table top water dispenser ===
A smaller unit that can be placed directly on the table to dispense hot or cold water. This is also frequently known as a countertop water dispenser.

=== Direct piping water dispenser ===
Connects directly to the water source for an auto-refill of constant hot or cold filtered pure drinking water.

=== Boiling water tap ===
Fed from an under-sink hot water dispenser plumbed directly into the water supply, boiling hot taps supply instant 98 °C (208 °F)+ degree water upon activation of the additional rap lever, or in some cases, an additional motion of the existing lever.

Boiling water taps are designed to be energy-efficient, using only the necessary amount of water, reducing waste, and lowering energy consumption.

Most boiling water taps offer child locks and insulated spouts. These are essential for preventing accidental burns and providing peace of mind for households with children.

== Operation ==
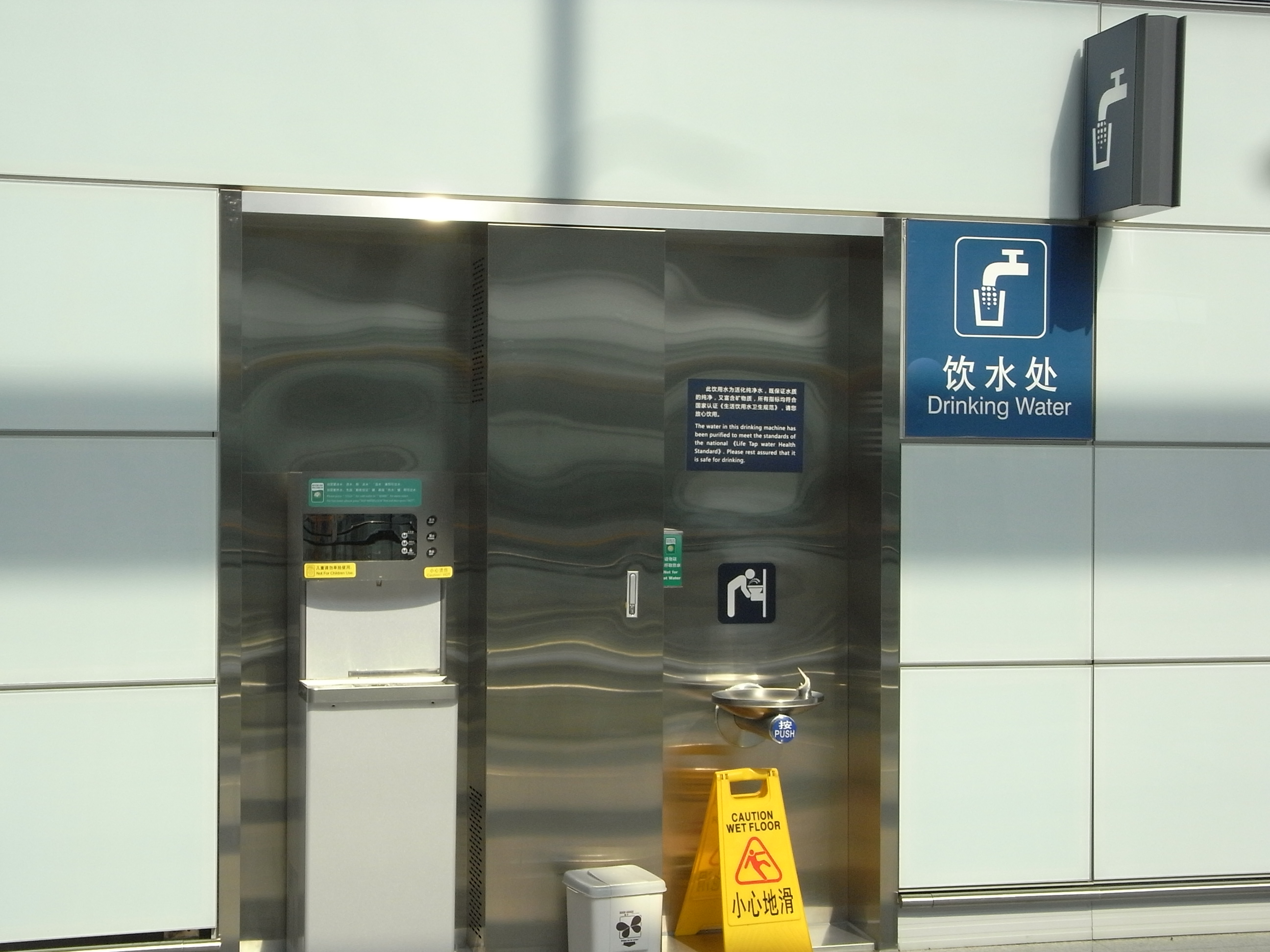
A water fountain (right) and a hot water dispenser (left) in Beijing Capital International Airport

Most types have a small thermally insulated tank with a heater that keeps the water in the tank hot.

When the handle is pressed, cool tap water flows into the tank, displacing the near-boiling water, which then flows out of the spout. When the handle is released, the valve closes, and hot water stops flowing. The cool water is then heated to up to about 94 °C (201 °F). Some claim their water tank heats the water to 110 °C (230 °F), meaning the water flows out of the spout at 100 °C (212 °F).

Some tanks feature a 750 W heater that delivers up to 14 liters (60 U.S. cups) of water per hour at a temperature set by a dial. Some models are equipped with a filtration system to remove contaminants, and can dispense hot or cool filtered water. Advanced filtration systems can reduce chlorine taste, odor, sediment, toxic chemicals, heavy metals such as lead, and dangerous minerals.

They also remove sometimes dangerous parasites and protozoa such as cryptosporidium, although the high temperature prevents them from being a hazard in the hot water.

== Energy efficiency ==
A hot water dispenser, which keeps water hot in a tank, uses energy to heat the water to the required temperature and wastes energy to keep it hot in a thermally insulated tank when not in use. These tank-type dispensers often also consist of energy-wasting 'keep warm' and 'reboil' functions.

On the other hand, an instant hot water dispenser without a tank does not waste significant energy. When hot water is needed, the instant heater consumes at least 2000 watts to produce hot water at 92 °C and above. The hot water flow rate is approximately 20 litres per hour. Comparing this with the insulated tank type of hot water dispensers that consumes approximately 500 W, the amount of energy savings to produce 20 litres of hot water is at least 5 times lower. The savings not only comes from the speed, but also instant hot water dispensers do not 'keep warm' nor 'reboil'. In fact, it further provides the convenience that users need not switch off the appliance when not in use.

In many cases, the alternative is to heat water using a device such as a kettle. If only the amount of water needed is heated, energy usage is less: the same energy is used for heating [needs clarification: only true if the kettle and the dispenser have the same thermal transfer, which is very unlikely], but none for keeping hot. If more water than needed is boiled in a kettle, energy is wasted in heating the unwanted water, which then cools.

Sometimes a supply of an unknown amount of instant hot water is required, for example when cooking risotto boiling water must be added instantly as needed. This can only be achieved with a kettle by boiling the maximum amount that can be needed; in cases of this nature the instant water heater, which heats and dispenses only what is needed, is always more efficient.

Overall comparative efficiency can only be estimated by calculating the energy wasted by the water heater, and comparing it with that wasted by heating more water than necessary in a kettle in typical circumstances. Kettle efficiency is subject to patterns of usage, and can be improved by user discipline; dispenser efficiency cannot be so improved. Switching off when not needed, as at night, would save a lot of energy and improve overall efficiency.

== Installation ==
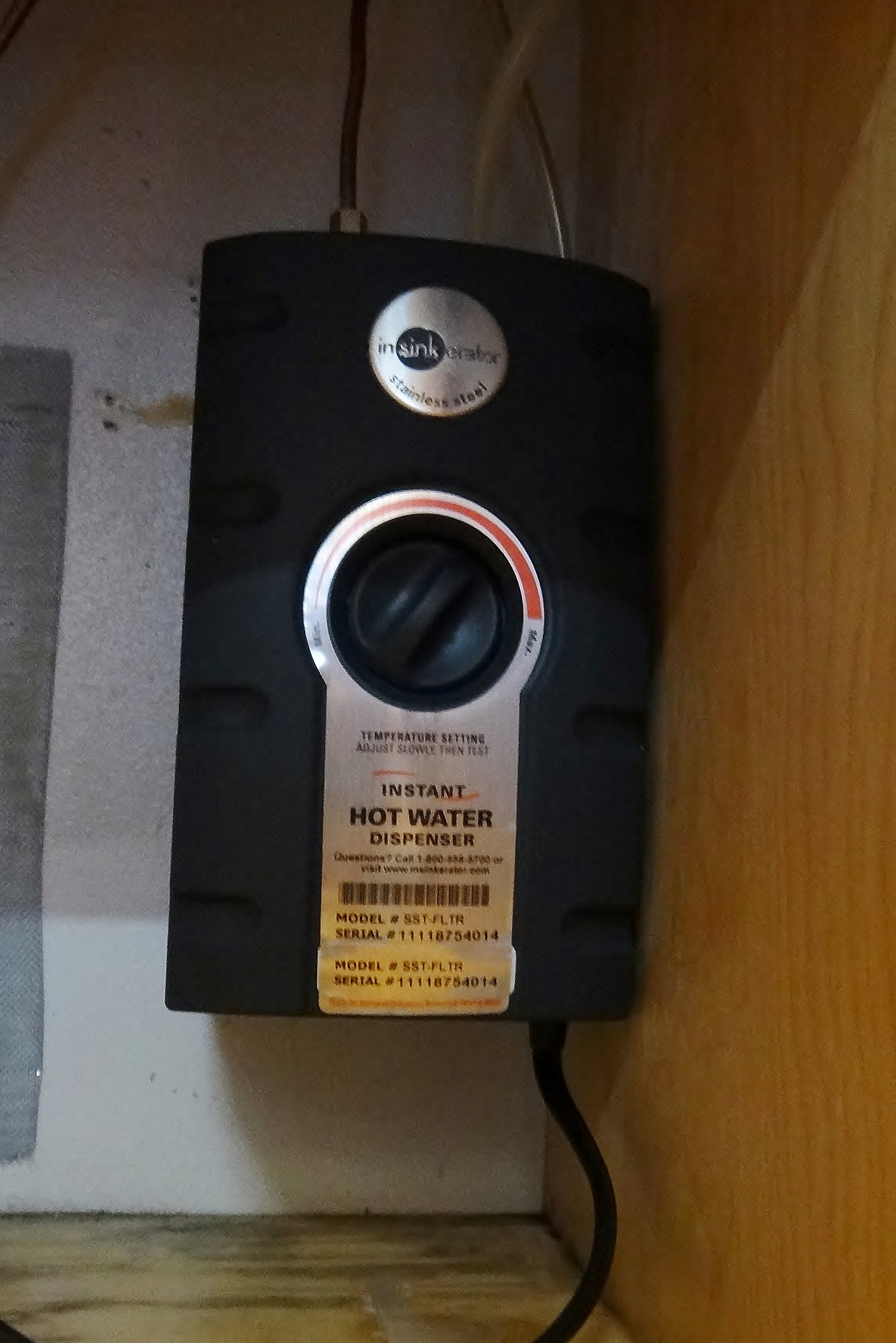
An installed instant hot water dispenser

Instant hot water tank dispensers can be installed by owners or plumbers, usually in a standard sink hole with the tank below the sink.

== See also ==
- Water dispenser
- Water heating
- Electric water boiler
- Electric kettle
- Zojirushi Corporation
- Tiger Corporation
