= Making Sweden an Oil-Free Society =

2006 Swedish government report

Crude oil prices from 1987 to 2012

In 2005 the government of Sweden appointed a commission to draw up a comprehensive programme to reduce Sweden's dependence on petroleum, natural gas and other 'fossil raw materials' by 2020. In June 2006 (less than three months before the 2006 general election) the commission issued its report, entitled Making Sweden an Oil-Free Society (Swedish: På väg mot ett oljefritt Sverige). The report cited four reasons to reduce oil dependence:

- The impact of oil prices on Swedish economic growth and employment
- The link between oil, peace and security throughout the world
- The great potential to use Sweden's own clean renewable energy resources in place of oil
- The threat of climate change resulting from the extensive burning of fossil fuels

As of 2005, oil supplies provided about 32% of the country's energy supply, with nuclear power and hydroelectricity providing much of the remainder. Although the report did not propose to end the use of oil entirely, the 2020 date was suggested as a marker on a continuing process of the "oil phase-out in Sweden".

Following defeat of the incumbent government coalition in the 2006 general election, the proposals were not included in the energy policy or in any law. "Sweden's energy policy, in both the short and the long term, is to safeguard the supply of electricity and other forms of energy on terms that are competitive with the rest of the world. It is intended to create the right conditions for efficient use of energy and a cost efficient Swedish supply of energy, with minimum adverse effect on health, the environment or climate, and assisting the move towards an ecologically sustainable society."

== Commission on Oil Independence ==
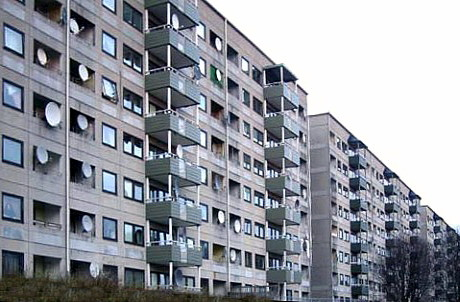
Housing in Angered

To make recommendations on how dependency on oil should be broken, the government created a Commission on Oil Independence (Kommissionen för att bryta oljeberoendet i Sverige till år 2020), headed by the then Prime Minister Göran Persson, which reported in June 2006.

In their report, the Commission proposed the following targets for 2020:

- consumption of oil in road transport to be reduced by 40–50 per cent;
- consumption of oil in industry to be cut by 25–40 per cent;
- heating buildings with oil, a practice already cut by 70% since the 1973 oil crisis, should be phased out;
- overall, energy should be used 20% more efficiently.

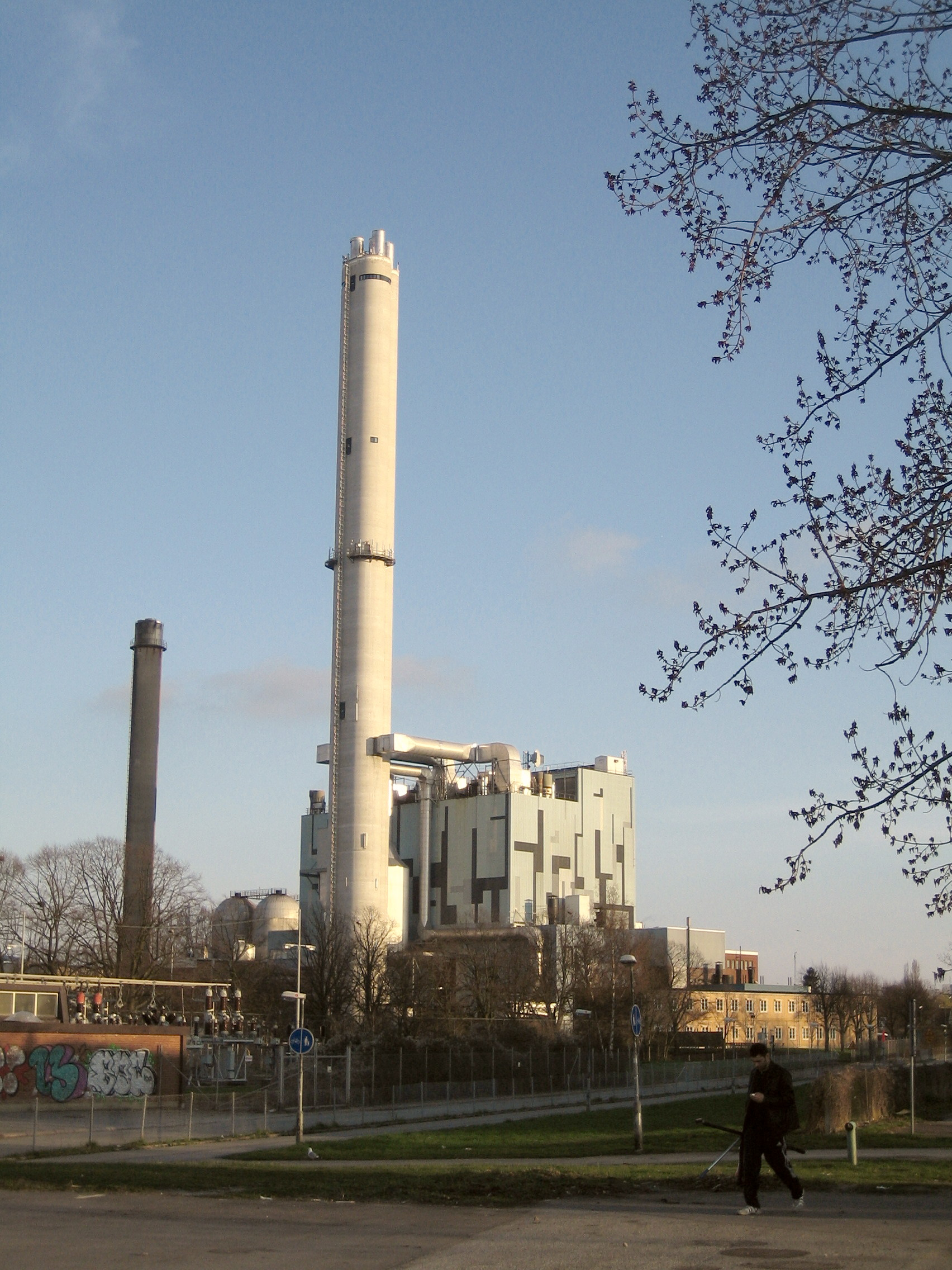
Power plant in Malmö, 2006

Replacing oil with renewable energy sources and energy conservation measures to cut total energy use was envisioned. This is also expected to result in cuts in carbon emissions and to strengthen the country's role in sustainable development technologies as well as increasing its international economic competitiveness.

=== Energy sources ===
Technical solutions under consideration include the further development of domestically grown biofuels, solar cells, fuel cells, wind farms, wave energy, a major increase in district heating schemes and greater use of geothermal heat pumps. It is expected that research, development and commercialization of such technologies should be supported by government.

The commission also recommended that the government should not sanction the creation of a national natural gas infrastructure, on the belief that this would inhibit the development of biofuels and encourage the use of gas in place of oil.

=== Energy use ===
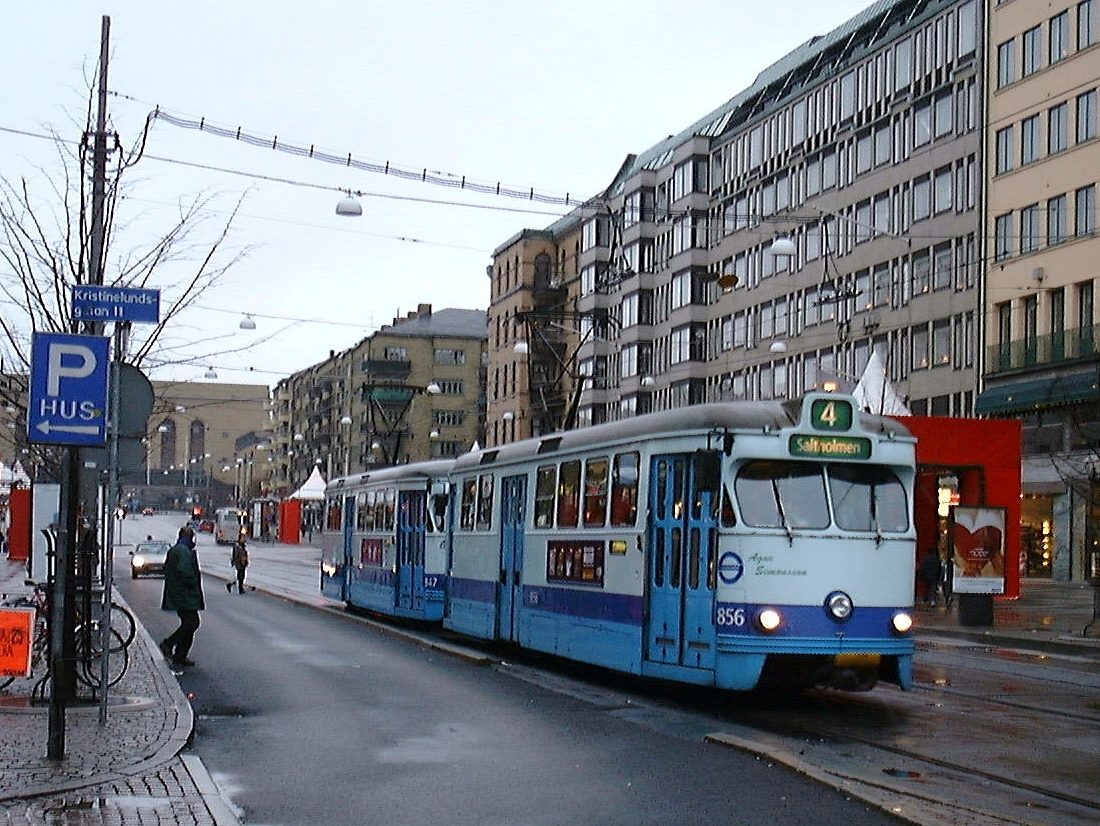
Gothenburg tram system, 1999

To cut energy use, the commission anticipated that by 2020 at least 75% of all new housing would use low-energy building techniques similar to the German passive house standard, and that it will also be necessary to modernize the existing housing stock, including replacing direct electric heating systems (with systems heated by district heating, biofuels or heat pumps).

They also expect there to be a greater use of remote work, videotelephony and web conferencing, public transport, ship transport, hybrid vehicles, and smaller, lighter, biodiesel cars.

As part of reducing industrial consumption, it is proposed that carbon allowances issued in Sweden under the European Union Emission Trading Scheme should be cut to 75% of their initial levels by 2020.

The taxation system is also likely to be used to influence energy choices, together with education and public awareness initiatives.

== Progress ==
On their release, the commission's proposals were supported by the national automotive industry association, BIL Sweden. It was, however, opposed by the timber industry, who fear that land producing profitable exports may become used for low-income domestic biofuel production. As of 2008, 43% of the Swedish primary energy supply comes from renewable sources, which is the largest share in any European Union country.

In September, 2015, the Swedish government announced its plan to drastically cut its reliance on fossil fuels by 2020. This plan also includes the goal of having the capital, Stockholm, 100% powered by renewable resources by 2050. Though the goal is to have the entire country run on renewable resources, there is no temporal goal yet.

== Ban of fossil fuel-driven vehicles ==
In 2008, Swedish political party Centerpartiet proposed to ban gasoline fossil fuel-driven vehicles by 2025–2030.

== See also ==
- Climate change in Sweden
- Coal phase out
- Alternative propulsion
- Hydrogen fuel replacement in Iceland
- Renewable energy development
- Renewable energy in the European Union
