= Electric shower =

Self-heating shower heads

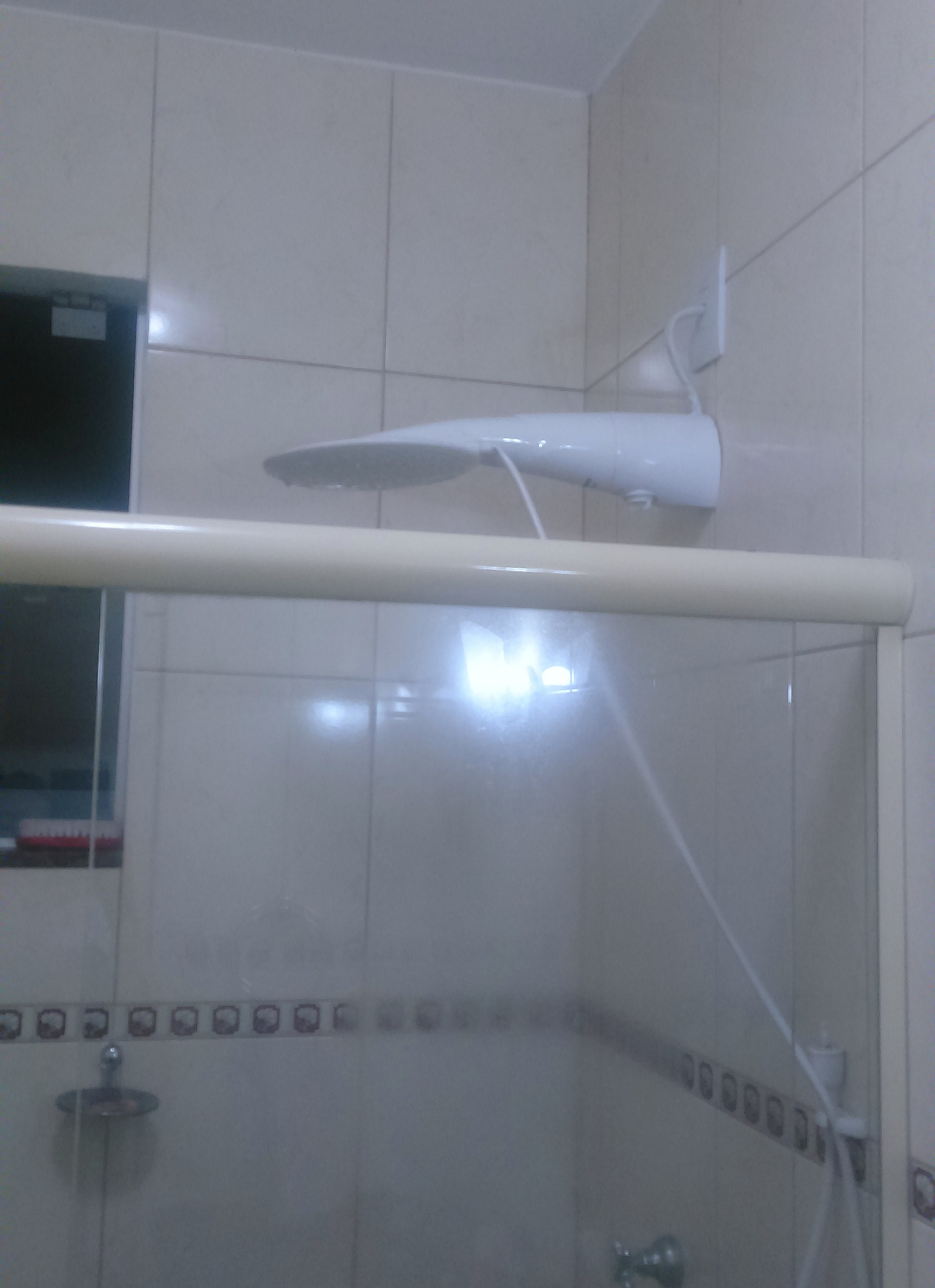
Electric shower

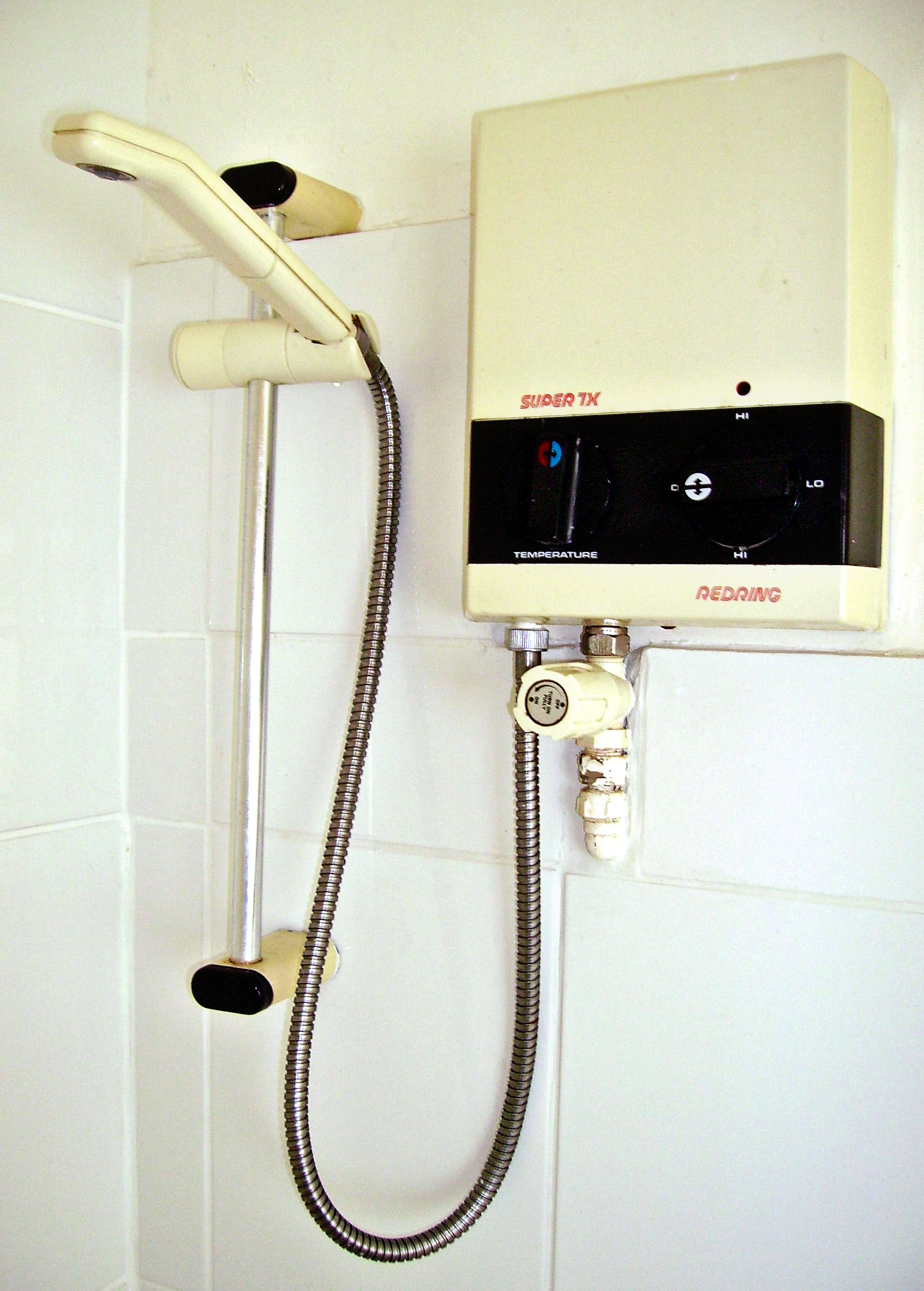
In the UK

An electric shower or electric shower head are self-heating shower heads that use an immersion heater which is turned on with the flow of water. A group of separate electric heating elements can be switched to offer different heating levels or with an electronic temperature control (using hi-power dimmer). They are specialized point-of-use tankless water heaters and are widely used in some countries such as Brazil and to a lesser extent in Central America. In some countries such as the UK, Malaysia and the Philippines, a tankless electric heater can be placed directly in the shower wall.

Invented in Brazil by Francisco Canhos in the 1930s due to a lack of central gas distribution and used frequently since the 1940s, the electric shower is a home appliance often seen in South and Central American countries due to the higher costs of gas distribution, combined with households that in most cases do not support conventional water heaters, as they do not have dedicated hot water piping. Earlier models were made of chromed copper or brass, which were expensive and carried an electric shock risk due to the metallic exterior, but since 1970, units made of injected plastics are popular due to low prices similar to that of a hair dryer.

Electric showers have a simple electric system, working like a coffee maker, but with a larger water flow. A pressure switch turns on the device when enough water flows through it, pressurizing the interior. Once the water is stopped, the device turns off automatically. An ordinary electric shower often but not always has three heat settings: high for winter (5.5 kW), low for summer (2.5 kW), or cold (0 W) to use when a central heater system is available or in hot seasons. Higher power (up to 7.5 KW) and lower power (up to 3.2 KW) versions are also made, as well as versions with 4 heat settings or a variable heat setting controlled by a semiconductor device such as a triac, and a dial or stick that is rotated by the user.

== Energy usage ==
The power consumption of electric showers at the maximum heating setting is about 5.5 kW for 127 V and 7.5 kW for 220 V. The lower costs with electric showers compared to the higher costs with tank boilers is due to the time of use: an electric shower uses energy only while the water flows, while a tank boiler works many times a day to keep a quantity of standing water hot for use throughout the day and night. Moreover, the transfer of electric energy to the water in an electric shower head is very efficient, approaching 100%. Electric showers may save energy compared to electric tank heaters, which lose some standby heat.

== Safety ==
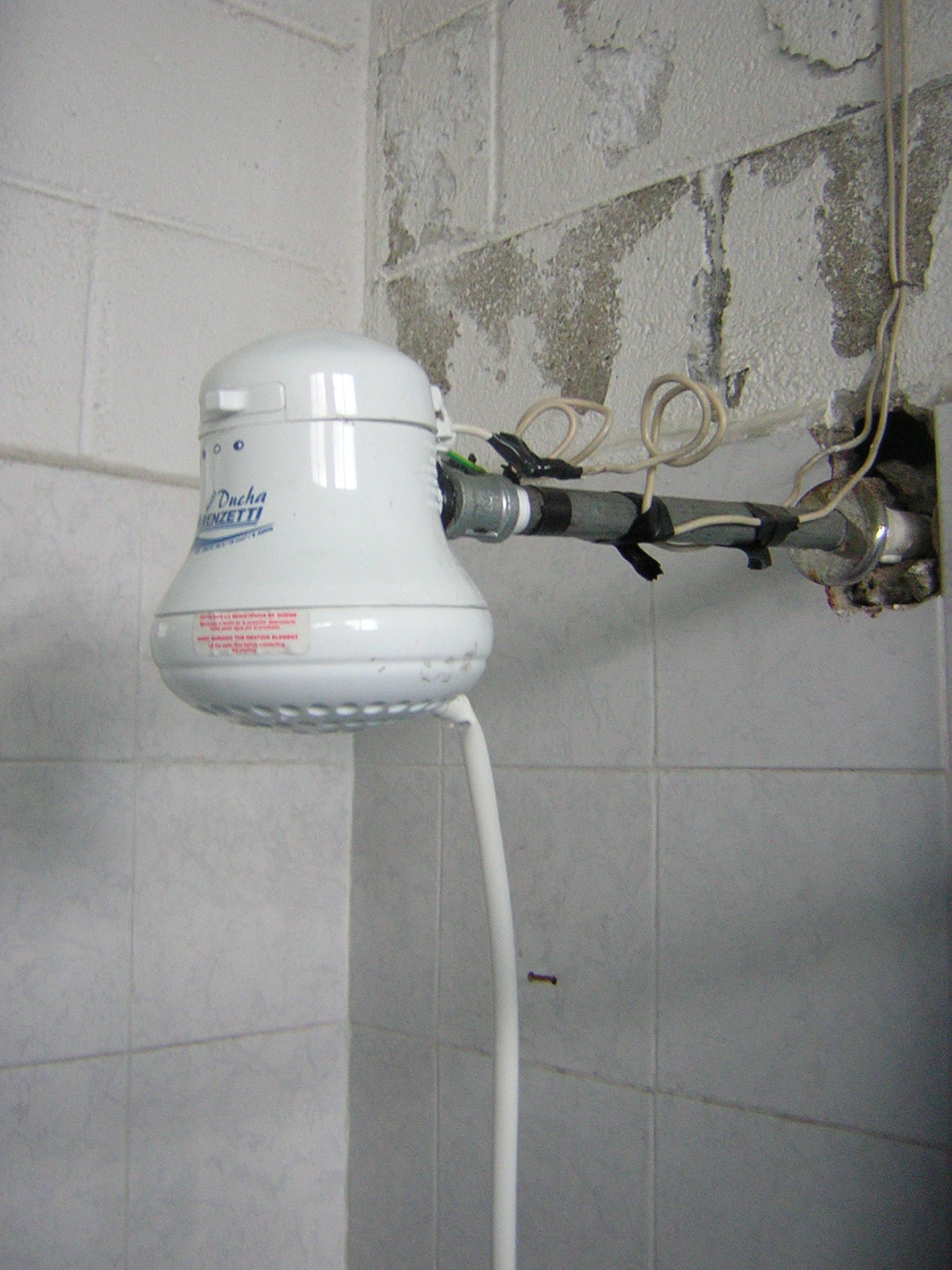
An example of a poorly installed electric shower head.

There is a wide range of electric shower heads, with various designs and types of heating controls. The heating element of an electric shower is immersed in the water stream, using an often replaceable nichrome resistive heating element which is often not sheathed and electrically isolated, in which case isolation is provided by earthing electrodes that directly touch the water before it exits the head. Electric shower heads with sheathed and electrically isolated heating elements are often marketed as such (chuveiros blindados in Portuguese) and are more expensive. Due to electrical safety standards as well as cost, modern electric showers are made of plastic instead of using metallic casings like in the past.

As an electrical appliance that uses more electric current than a clothes washer or a hair dryer, an electric shower installation requires careful planning, and generally is intended to be wired directly from the electrical distribution box with a dedicated circuit breaker and ground system. A poorly installed system with old aluminum wires, bad connections or an unconnected ground wire (which is often the case) may be dangerous (giving rise to the derogatory term suicide shower), as the wires can overheat or electric current may leak via the water stream through the body of the user to earth.
