= Zojirushi =

Japanese manufacturing company

Zojirushi Corporation 象印マホービン株式会社

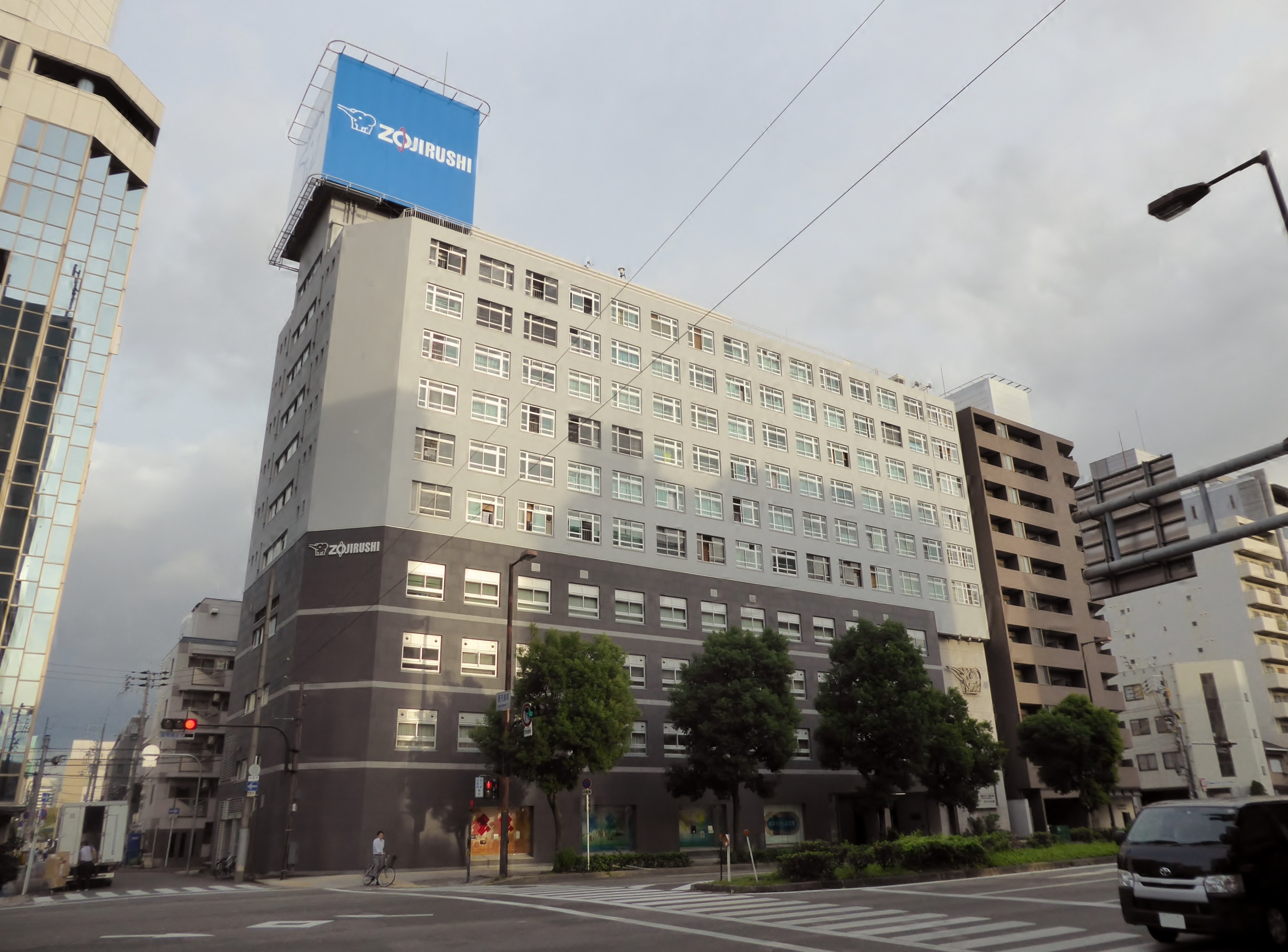
- Zojirushi headquarters in Osaka
- Type: Public KK
- Traded as: TYO: 7965
- Founded: 1918; 108 years ago
- Headquarters: Osaka, Japan
- Area served: Worldwide
- Products: Rice Cookers, Vacuum Flasks, Hot Water Dispensers
- Revenue: JPY 84.6 billion (FY 2018) (US$ 765.9 million) (FY 2018)
- Number of employees: 1,198 (2013)
- Website: www.zojirushi.global

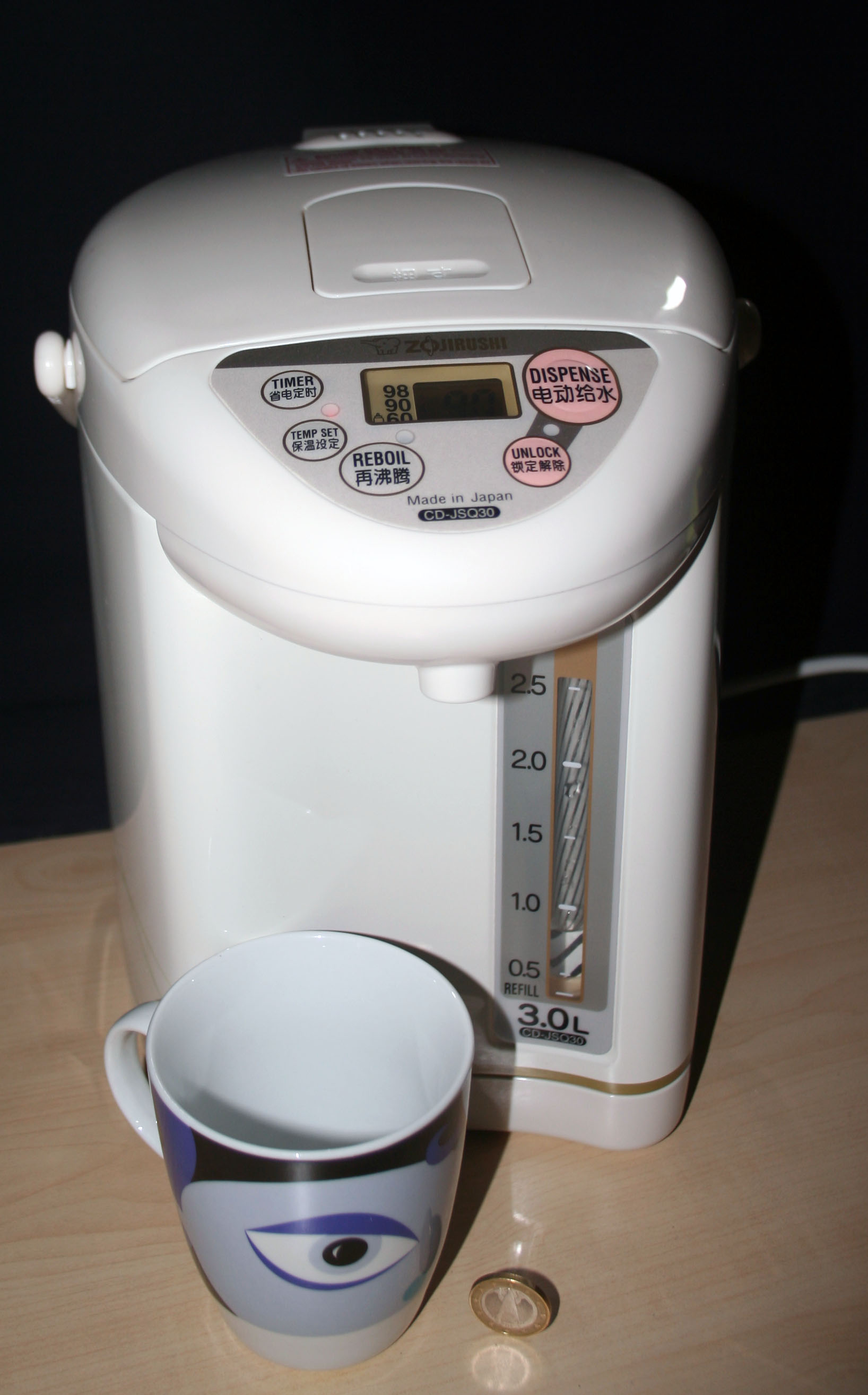
Zojirushi 3-liter electric water boiler CD-JSQ30

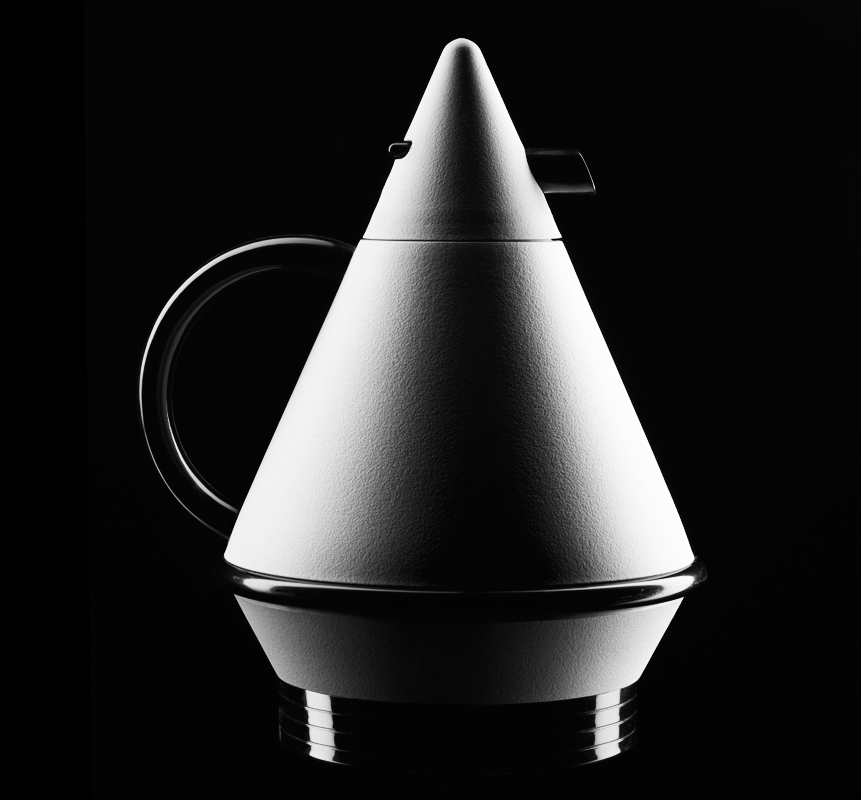
Zojirushi Carafe K. Shigeto Memphis Milano

The Zojirushi Corporation (象印マホービン株式会社, Zōjirushi Mahōbin Kabushiki-gaisha) is a Japanese multinational manufacturer and marketer of vacuum flasks, beverage dispensers, thermos-style lunch jars, and consumer electronics including rice cookers, electric water boilers, hot plates, bread machines, electric kettles, and hot water dispensers. It has a branch in South Korea and subsidiary companies in Taiwan, China, Hong Kong, and the United States. Zojirushi is listed on the Tokyo Stock Exchange.

The company was founded in 1918 as the Ichikawa Brothers Trading Company in Osaka and in 1948 was changed to Kyowa Manufacturing Co., Ltd. In 1961, the company changed its name again from Kyowa Manufacturing Co., Ltd to the Zojirushi Corporation and adopted its current corporate logo, which includes an elephant (象, zō) (Zōjirushi means "elephant mark").

Some Zojirushi rice cooker models include a coating of Sumiflon (スミフロン), a self-cleaning fluoropolymer-aluminium composite developed by Sumitomo Electric.
