= Water dispenser =

Machine that cools or heats up and dispenses water

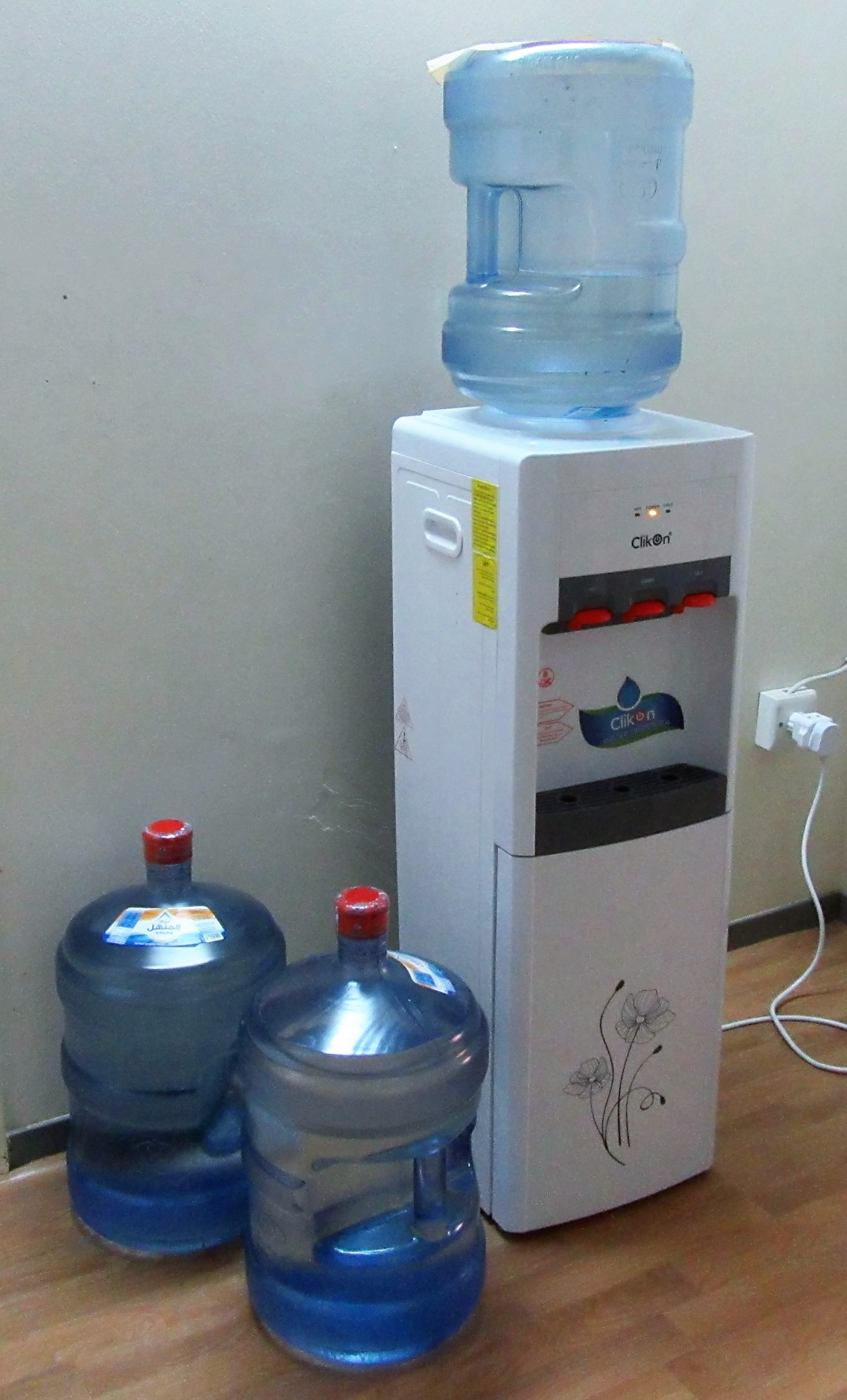
A water dispenser with refill water bottles

A water dispenser, sometimes referred to as a water cooler (if used for cooling only), is a machine that dispenses and often also cools or heats up water with a refrigeration unit. It is commonly located near the restroom due to closer access to plumbing. A drain line is also provided from the water cooler into the sewer system.

Water dispensers come in a variety of form factors, ranging from wall-mounted to bottle filler water dispenser combination units, to bi-level units and other formats. They are generally broken up into two categories: point-of-use (POU) water dispensers and bottled water dispensers. POU water dispensers are connected to a water supply, while bottled water dispensers require delivery (or self-pick-up) of water in large bottles from vendors. Bottled water dispensers can be top-mounted or bottom-loaded, depending on the design of the model.

Bottled water dispensers typically use 5-gallon (18.9 litre) bottles (carboys) commonly located on top of the unit. Pressure coolers are a subcategory of water dispensers encompassing drinking water fountains and direct-piping water dispensers. Water cooler may also refer to a primitive device for keeping water cool.

== History ==
The water dispenser was first invented in 1906 by Luther Haws.

== Dispenser types ==
=== Wall-mounted / recessed ===
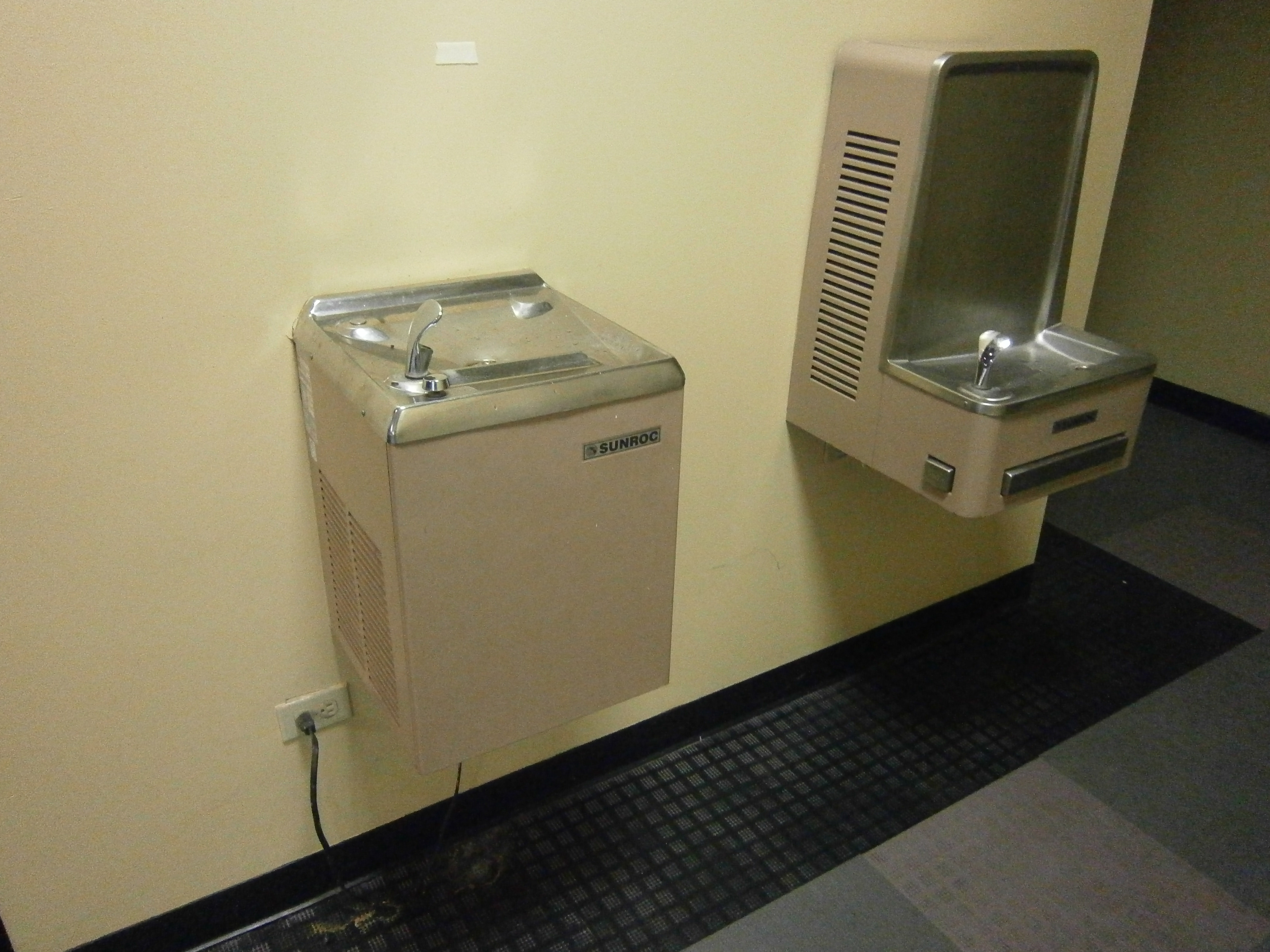
Wall-mounted water dispensers

The wall-mounted type is connected to the building's water supply for a continuous supply of water and electricity to run a refrigeration unit to cool the incoming water, and to the building's waste disposal system to dispose of unused water. Wall-mounted water coolers are frequently used in commercial buildings like hospitals, schools, businesses, and other facilities where a facility manager is present to monitor its installation and maintenance.

In the standard wall-mounted cooler, also commonly referred to as a water fountain or drinking fountain, a small tank in the machine holds chilled water so the user does not have to wait for chilled water. Water is delivered by turning or pressing a button on a spring-loaded valve located on the top of the unit, that turns off the water when released. Some devices also offer a large button on the front or side. Newer machines may not have a button at all; instead, a sensor that detects when someone is near and activates the water. Water is delivered in a stream that arches up, allowing the user to drink directly from the top of the stream of water. These devices usually dispense water directly from the municipal water supply, without treatment or filtering.

Wall mount water coolers come in a wide variety of styles, from recessed models to splash resistant, contoured basins protruding out from the wall, traditional rounded square edge designs, bottle filler and water cooler combination units, bi-level designs, with other features and options. These are sometimes installed to meet local, state or federal codes.

=== Bottom-load water dispenser ===
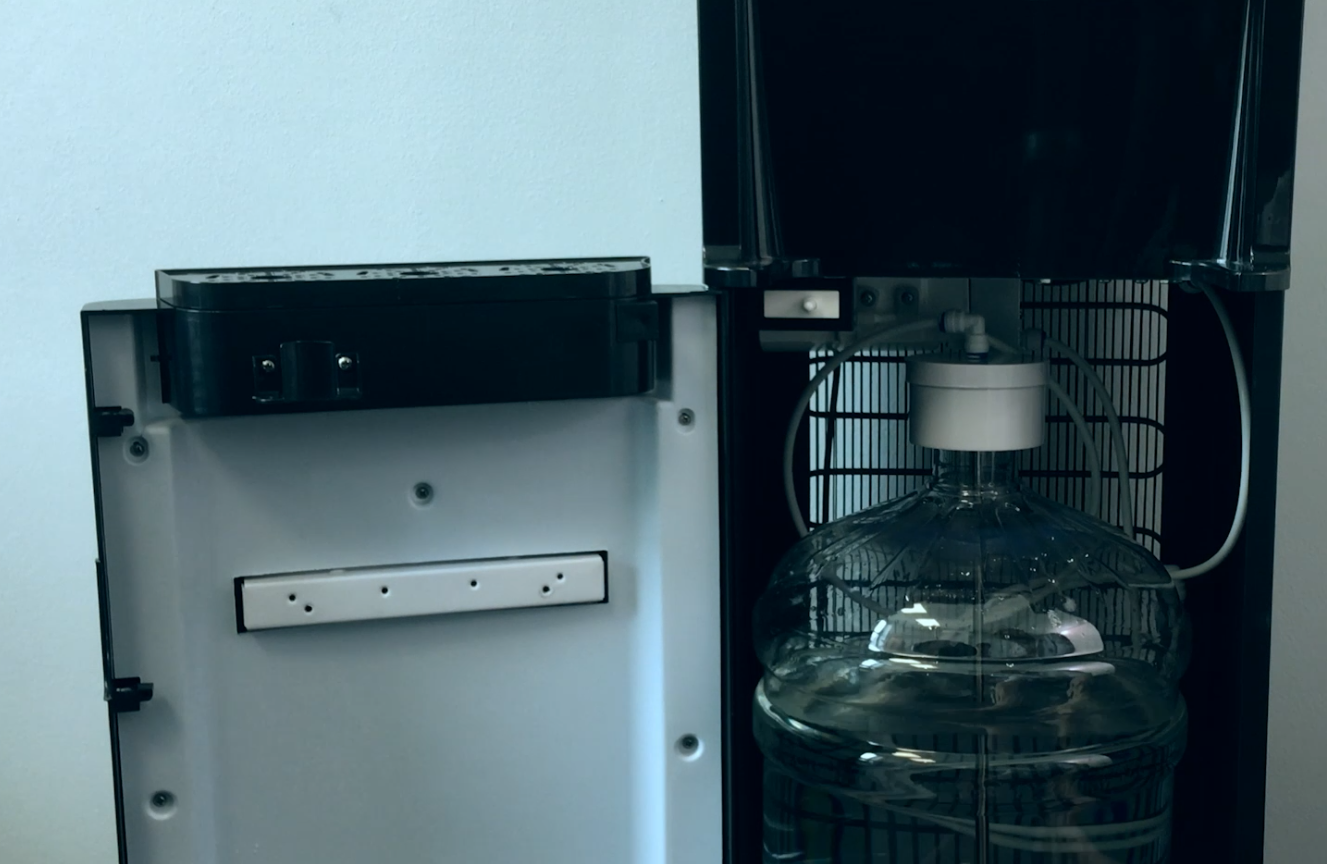
Bottom load water dispenser revealing 5-gallon bottle, with cabinet opened

Water dispensers commonly have the water supply vessel mounted at the top of the unit. Bottom-load water dispensers have the vessel mounted at the bottom of the unit to make loading easier.

=== Tabletop water dispenser ===
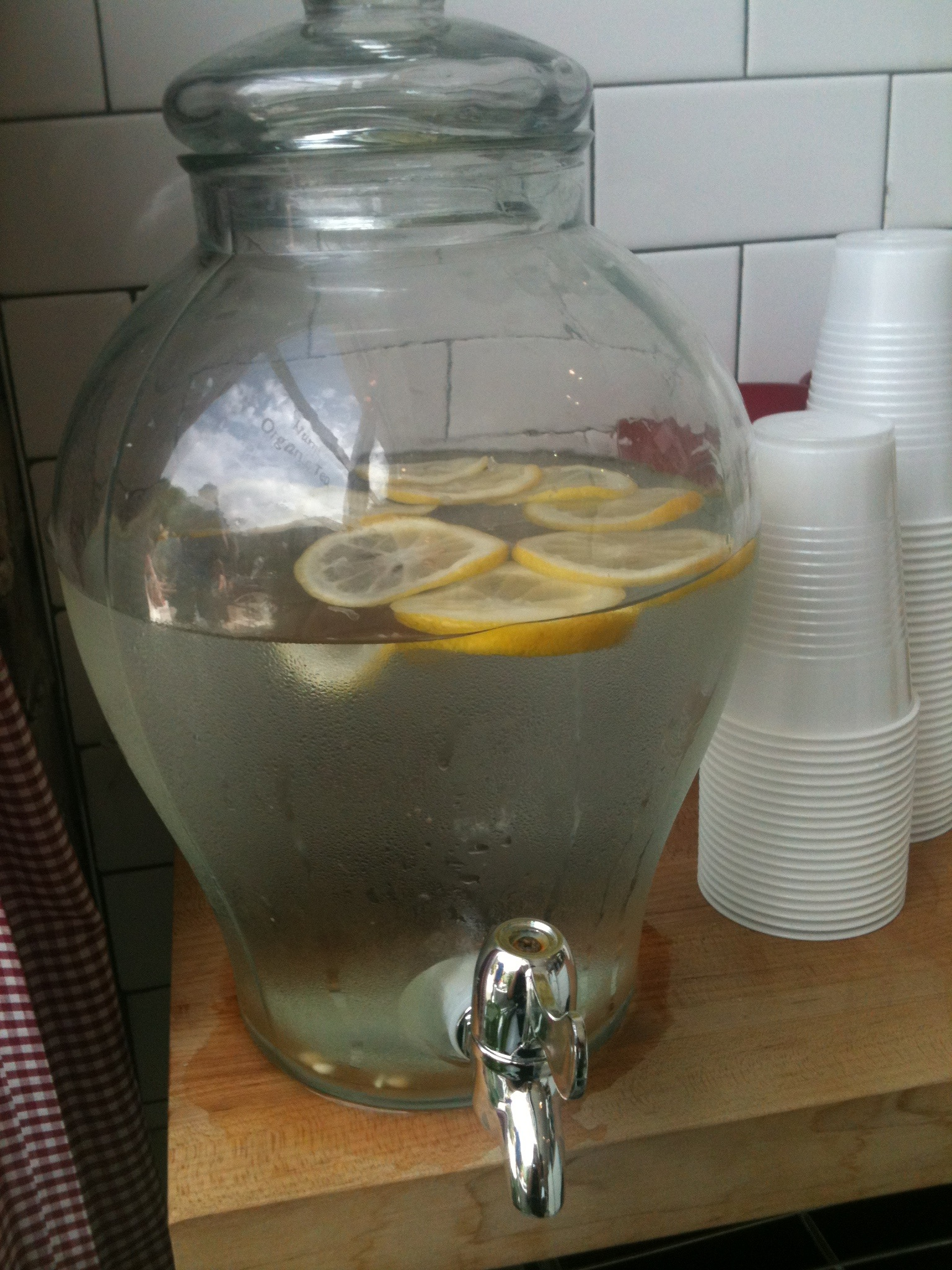
Tabletop water dispenser

There are also smaller versions of the water dispensers where the dispenser can be placed directly on top of a table. These dispensers are commonly classified as household appliances and can often be found in household kitchens and office pantries.

=== Direct-piping water dispenser (POU) ===
Water dispensers can be directly connected to the in-house water source for continuous dispensing of hot and cold drinking water. It is commonly referred to as POU (point of use) water dispensers. POU units are generally more hygienic than bottled water coolers, provided the end user has access to clean water sources.

=== Freestanding ===
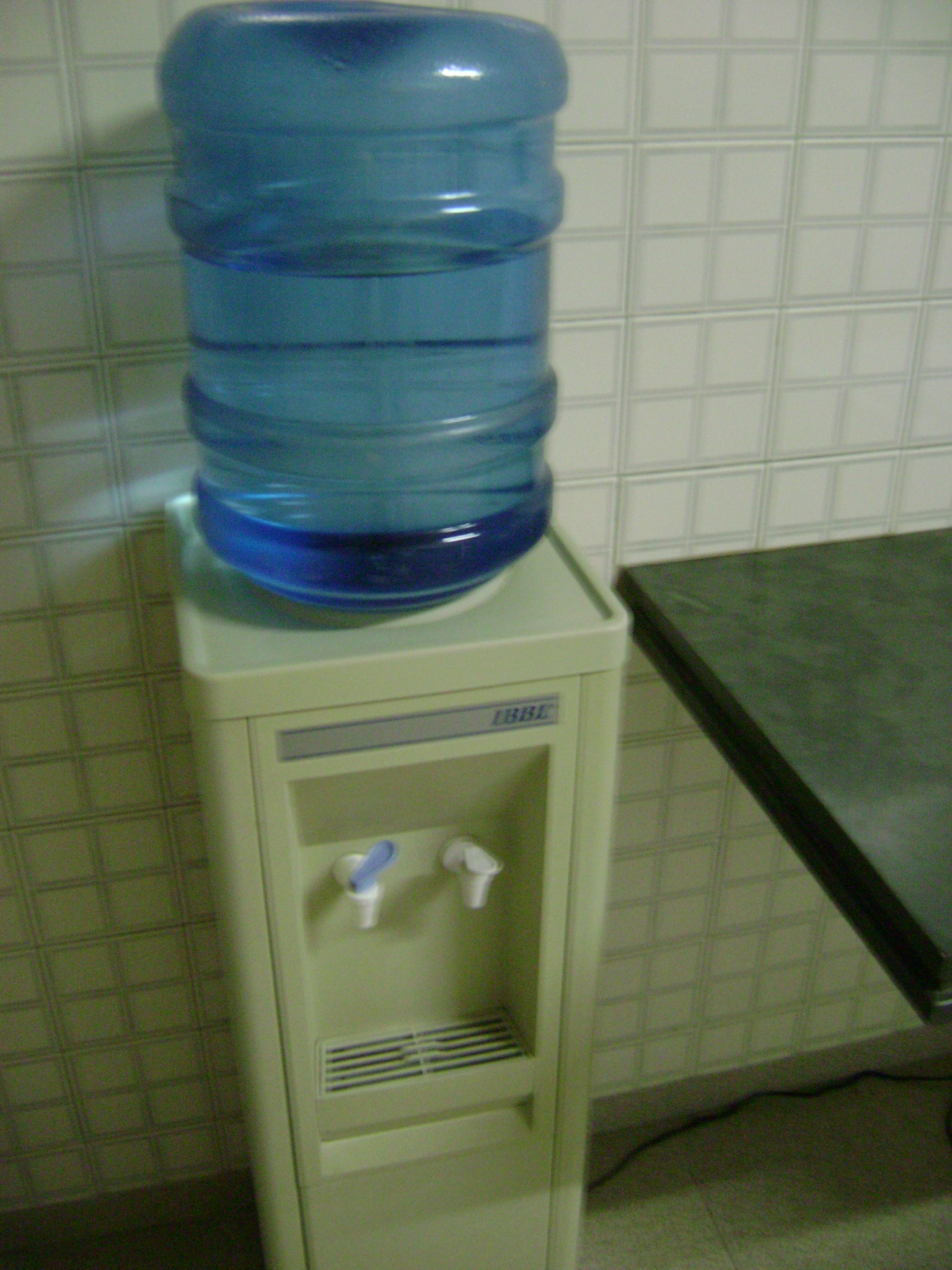
Freestanding water cooler with a bottle

A freestanding design generally involves bottles of water placed spout-down into the dispensing machine.

Tabletop or kitchen worktop versions are available which utilize readily available five-liter water bottles from supermarkets. These coolers use air pumps to push the water into the cooling chamber and Peltier devices to chill the water.

New development within the water cooler market is the advent of countertop appliances which are connected to the mains and provide an instant supply of not only chilled water but also hot and boiling water. This is often visible in the horeca industry.

Water will flow faster when the handle is in the upright position. The water is aerated which allows the water to come through the spout at a faster rate.

== Water source ==
Water dispensed from water coolers may originate from many different sources, but are often classified into two major categories, namely natural mineral and spring water, and purified water.

=== Natural mineral and spring water ===
Natural mineral and spring water are waters emanating from underground geological rock formations collected from boreholes or emerging springs. Legislation in each respective country further differentiates between these two types of water and stipulates strict naming and labeling criteria based on natural source protection, total dissolved solids, and the amount of processing the water may undergo prior to bottling.

=== Purified water ===
Purified water is water from groundwater or municipal water supply and is produced by any one of several methods of purification including reverse osmosis, distillation, deionization, and filtration. The water is often treated by ultraviolet light or ozone for antimicrobial reasons and re-mineralized by injection of soluble inorganic salts.

== Water delivery ==
The delivery of water in a water cooler comes in two main forms, namely bottled variants, or plumbed directly from the main water supply. The water is normally pumped into a water tank to be heated or chilled, depending on the model of the water cooler. Modern versions include hybrid models that are able to utilize both methods.

=== Bottled water coolers ===
To install the bottle, the bottle is tipped upside down and set onto the dispenser; a probe punctures the cap of the bottle and allows the water to flow into the machine's internal reservoir. These gravity-powered systems have a device to dispense water in a controlled manner.

These machines come in different sizes and vary from table units, intended for occasional use to floor-mounted units intended for heavier use. Bottled water is normally delivered to households or businesses on a regular basis, where empty returnable polycarbonate bottles are exchanged for full ones. In developing markets, PET is often used for large bottles despite shrinkage and lower washing temperature will lead to making it a more challenging material to use.

The bottle size varies with the size of the unit, with the larger versions in the US using 5-US-gallon (19 L) bottles. This is also the most common size elsewhere, labeled as 18.9 liters in countries that use the metric system. Originally, these bottles were manufactured at 3, 5 or 6 US gallon capacity (11.4, 18.9 or 22.7 liters) and supplied to rented water cooler units. These units usually do not have a place to dump excess water, only offering a small basin to catch minor spills. On the front, a lever or pushbutton dispenses the water into a cup held beneath the spigot. When the water container is empty, it is lifted off the top of the dispenser, and automatically seals to prevent any excess water still in the bottle from leaking.

==== Material ====
For many years and throughout the 20th century, glass was the main material used for bottling until the evolution of thermoplastics following World War II. PVC evolved as a multi-purpose plastic material and gained mass adoption as an ideal mass production material. Only dark green glass bottles were retained for packaging carbonated waters. The 1980s saw the re-development of PVC bottles due to cost reduction. Advances in manufacturing and materials technology such as new blow and injection molding techniques have reduced the wall thickness and weight of bottles while improving durability and increasing service life.

=== Direct plumbed ===
Directly plumbed water coolers use tap water and therefore do not need bottles due to their use of the main water supply. Usually, some method of purification is used. Log reduction (e.g. 6-log reduction or 99.9999% effective) is used as a measure on the effectiveness of sanitization and disinfection.

== Purification ==
=== Filtration ===
Filtration methods include reverse osmosis, ion exchange, and activated carbon. Reverse osmosis works differently from chemical or ultraviolet protection, using a membrane that has fine pores, passing H_{2}O while preventing larger molecules such as salts, carbonates, and other micro-organisms from passing through it. If there is insufficient energy to naturally force the water through the membrane, a powerful pump is required, resulting in potential high energy costs. In addition, RO units are capable of softening water. Some living micro-organisms, including viruses, are capable of passing through an RO unit filter.

Deionizers or demineralizers use resins exchange to remove ions from the stream of water and are most commonly twin-bed or mixed-bed deionizers. It is often used in sterile manufacturing environments such as computer chips, where deionized water is a poor conductor of electricity.

In activated carbon, raw materials such as lignite, coal, bone charcoal, coconut shells, and wood charcoal are used, developing pores during activation when partly burning away carbon layers. In most cases, activated carbon is a single-use material as regeneration is often not possible on-site. Granular activated carbon (GAC) is most commonly used in the filtration of the water cooler. Regular sanitization using hot water and steam is required to limit bacterial growth.

=== Sanitization & disinfection ===
The sanitization of water is defined by the reduction of the number of micro-organisms to a safe level. According to the AOAC suspension test method, a sanitizer should be capable of killing 99.999% of a specific bacterial test population within 30 seconds at 25 °C (77 °F). Sanitizers may or may not necessarily destroy pathogenic or disease-causing bacteria. The sanitizer used must comply with regulations applicable in the geographic location. In the US, sanitizers are regulated by the EPA and FDA, and must pass the AOAC test in the reduction of microbial activity of two standard test organisms (Staphylococcus aureus and Escherichia coli) from a designated microbial load by a 5-log reduction.

The main difference between a sanitizer and a disinfectant is that at a specific use dilution, the disinfectant must have a higher kill capability for pathogenic bacteria than that of a sanitizer. If these micro-organisms are not destroyed, the bottled water being produced may be contaminated.

UVGI (ultraviolet germicidal irradiation) is a commonly used disinfection method to kill or inactivate micro-organisms and leaving them unable to perform vital cellular functions. Drawbacks to UV light water purifiers include turbidity. If the fluid is unclear, the UV light will not pass through completely, leaving the stream partially sterilized.

== Cooling and heating methods ==
=== Cooling ===
Most modern units offer a refrigeration function to chill the water, using Vapor compression refrigeration or Thermoelectric cooling.

==== Vapor compression refrigeration ====
Water coolers using vapor compression refrigeration come in one of the following systems:

- Reservoir System - A tank where water is held, to be used for cooling or heating and is fitted with a float mechanism to prevent overflowing.
  - Removable Reservoir - a removable reservoir is an open-end tank with cooling coils that come into contact with the external tank surface. It operates on the basis of a modular system, allowing one to easily detach and refill water instead of keeping it in a closed system. One of the advantages in using a removable reservoir is the ease of sanitization. This allows end users to replace the reservoir completely rather than sending an entire water cooler back for servicing. A similar technology can be found in many modern water dispensers and coffee machines.
  - Stainless Steel - open end tank with cooling coils that come into contact with the external tank surface
- Pressure Vessel Direct Chill System - The combination of a pressure vessel, which protects the water in the tank from air-borne contamination, and a direct chill system which cools water coming from the mains quickly.
  - Pressure Vessel - A sealed pressure vessel is filled at a lower pressure within the water cooler. As such, the water does not come into contact with the atmosphere, allowing a larger amount of cold water (depending on the size of the tank) to be dispensed at the expense of a slower cooling system.
  - Direct Chill - In a standard direct chill system, water is passed through a stainless steel coil that is in contact with a copper evaporator that circulates refrigerant gas. The refrigeration system is attached outside of the coil and the cold transfers through the pipe walls to chill the water in the coil through conduction. When the taps are operated, the chilled water is dispensed at mains pressure. The water never comes into contact with the atmosphere as the cold temperature emitted by the refrigerant gas is transferred through the copper coil which transfers the cold temperatures to water passing through the stainless steel coil without touching each other. This allows the water to get cold more quickly again at the expense of having a lower volume of cold water available.
- Ice-bank Cooling System - A pressurized stainless steel coil and a copper coil is immersed in a reservoir full of pre-chilled water. The copper coil containing the refrigerant gas freezes the water contained within the reservoir producing a cold supply, which in turns cools the drinking water flowing through stainless steel coil.

==== Thermoelectric cooling ====
Thermoelectric cooling is a green alternative to HFC refrigerant that uses a solid state device that acts as a heat pump to transfer heat from one side of the device to another using the Peltier effect. It is made up of numerous pairs of semiconductors enclosed by ceramic wafers. Thermoelectric coolers use direct current power rather than refrigerant gas and a compressor and have no moving parts or complex assemblies.

=== Heating ===
Some versions also have a second dispenser that delivers room-temperature water or even heated water that can be used for tea, hot chocolate or other uses. The water in the alternate hot tap is generally heated with a heating element and stored in a hot tank (much like the traditional hot water heaters used in residential homes). Additionally, the hot tap is usually equipped with a push-in safety valve to prevent burns from an accidental or inadvertent pressing of the lever.

== Additional features ==
=== Bottle filler ===
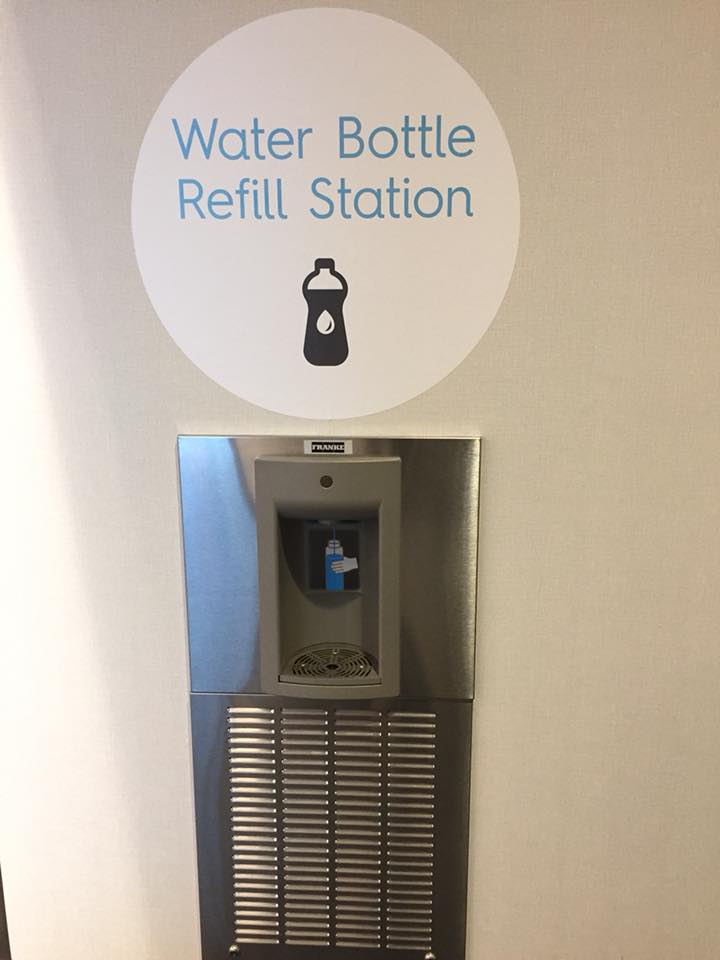
Modern variant with bottle filling functionality

Newer variants of water coolers include an additional dispenser designed to fill water bottles directly on wall-mounted units. This is increasingly common in public water coolers as they have also been spotted in public places such as airports and railway stations. These bottle filling units also can indicate the number of single-use plastic bottles saved as part of an ongoing public effort to reduce plastic pollution.

=== Carbonation ===
Modern variants of water coolers have been equipped with options for sparkling water as a result of increasing demand for carbonated beverages and also a greater awareness to healthy living, resulting in preference for carbonated water over sweetened carbonated beverages. This works with the addition of a mixer tank filled with compressed CO_{2} located inside the cooling tank. This brings the temperature of the CO_{2} gas down to the temperature of the cooling tank. As carbonated water is dispensed, the mixer tank is automatically refilled with cold water and carbon dioxide, ensuring a continuous supply of carbonated water is readily available.

== Environmental impact ==
The operational environmental footprint of under-bench MFT systems is heavily influenced by the heat dissipation mechanism employed in their refrigeration cycles. Systems using water-to-water heat exchangers draw potable mains water to cool the condenser, discharging the thermal coolant directly to wastewater drains, though a portion of this heat may be recovered to pre-heat incoming water for boiling reservoirs. Environmental Product Declarations (EPDs) certified under ISO 14025 and Product Category Rules such as PCR 2012:01 reveal that Module B7 (operational water use) in water-cooled units can equal or exceed the volume of drinking water delivered (exceeding a 1:1 drain-to-delivery ratio). Conversely, air-cooled systems dissipate heat via fan-forced ventilation, operating with a zero water-to-drain ratio in Module B7. To prevent time-dilution of operational impacts in building performance assessments, EPD data for commercial MFT installations is commonly normalized to a 7-year Reference Service Life (RSL) in accordance with ISO 15686 guidelines, reflecting standard commercial lease and refurbishment timelines.

== Maintenance ==
All bottled water coolers need to be periodically cleaned to prevent mineral build-up inside the heating tank, also known as scaling. The frequency of the cleaning can be determined by the concentration of the minerals and the amount of water used. Descaling agents such as citric acid can be used for this cleaning process.

Heating tanks will require cleaning when normal hot water flow appears to be restricted or when noisy heating cycles can be heard during operation. Additional symptoms include water coming from the cooling tank is very warm as well as a change of taste in the water resulting from mineral build-up.

== See also ==
- Drinking fountain
- Instant hot water dispenser
- International Bottled Water Association
- Refrigerator with built-in water dispenser.
- Soda fountain
- Tutedhara
- Vending machine
