= Air gap (plumbing) =

Vertical space between water outlet and flood level

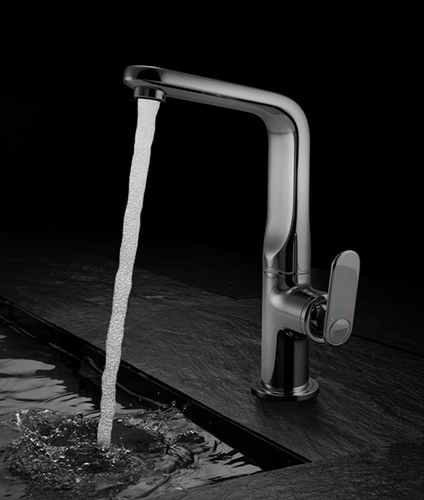
Water cannot flow from the sink to the tap in normal circumstances, even if the water supply loses pressure.

An air gap, as related to the plumbing trade, is the unobstructed vertical space between the water outlet and the flood level of a fixture. Air gaps of appropriate design are legally required by water health and safety regulations in many countries. An air gap is the simplest form of a backflow prevention device.

== Function ==
A simple example is the vertical space between a wall-mounted faucet and the sink rim (this space is the air gap). Water can easily fall from the faucet into the sink, but there is no way that water can be drawn up from the sink into the faucet. This arrangement prevents any contaminants in the sink from entering into the potable water system by siphonage; this is the simplest form of backflow prevention.

A common use of the term "air gap" in domestic plumbing refers to a specialized fixture that provides backflow prevention for an installed dishwasher. This "air gap" is visible above the sink as a small cylindrical fixture mounted near the faucet. In the base cabinet under the sink, the drain hose from the dishwasher feeds the "top" of the air gap, and the "bottom" of the air gap is plumbed into the sink drain below the basket, or into a garbage disposal unit. When installed and maintained properly, the air gap works as described above, and prevents drain water from the sink from backing up into the dishwasher, possibly contaminating dishes.

To further illustrate the air gap, consider what could happen if the air gap were eliminated by attaching a hose to the faucet and lowering the hose into a sink full of contaminated water. Under the right conditions (if the water supply loses pressure and the sink is higher than the point at which the water supply enters the house, for instance), the dirty water in the sink could be siphoned backwards into the water pipes through the hose and faucet. The dirty water could then be dispersed throughout the drinking water system.

== Standards and codes ==
All plumbing codes require backflow prevention in several ways. The fixtures must be manufactured and installed to meet these codes. Plumbers must not build cross-connections during their daily work practices, and plumbing inspectors look for improper designs or connections of piping and plumbing fixtures. A common misconception is that a "high loop" (routing a continuous drain line above a sink's flood level, for instance) will provide the same function as an air gap; this is not true, because the continuous connection in such a case will still allow backflow through siphoning.

According to the International Residential Code 2003, an air gap length must meet the requirements of being two times the effective inner diameter of the pipe (2×D) in order to be sufficient.

A standard widely use in the United States is:

- A112.1.2 Air Gaps in Plumbing Systems (For Plumbing Fixtures and Water-Connected Receptors)

In the United Kingdom, legislation is by statutory instrument and varies by country, but includes Water Supply (Water Quality) Regulations 2016 and Water Supply (Water Quality) Regulations (Wales). The categorization of air gaps is standardized by European standards, which cover the basic design and dimensions for appropriate to different uses.

- EN 13076 -- Devices to prevent pollution by backflow of potable water - Unrestricted air gap - Family A - Type A
- EN 13077 -- Devices to prevent pollution by backflow of potable water - Air gap with non-circular overflow (unrestricted) - Family A - Type B
- EN 13078 -- Devices to prevent pollution by backflow of potable water - Air gap with submerged feed incorporating air inlet plus overflow - Family A, type C
- and others for each family and type of air gap

== See also ==
- Hydrostatic loop
- Pressure vacuum breaker
- Double check valve
- Chemigation valve
- Reduced pressure zone device
- Atmospheric vacuum breaker
- Upstream contamination
