= Backwater valve =

Backflow prevention device

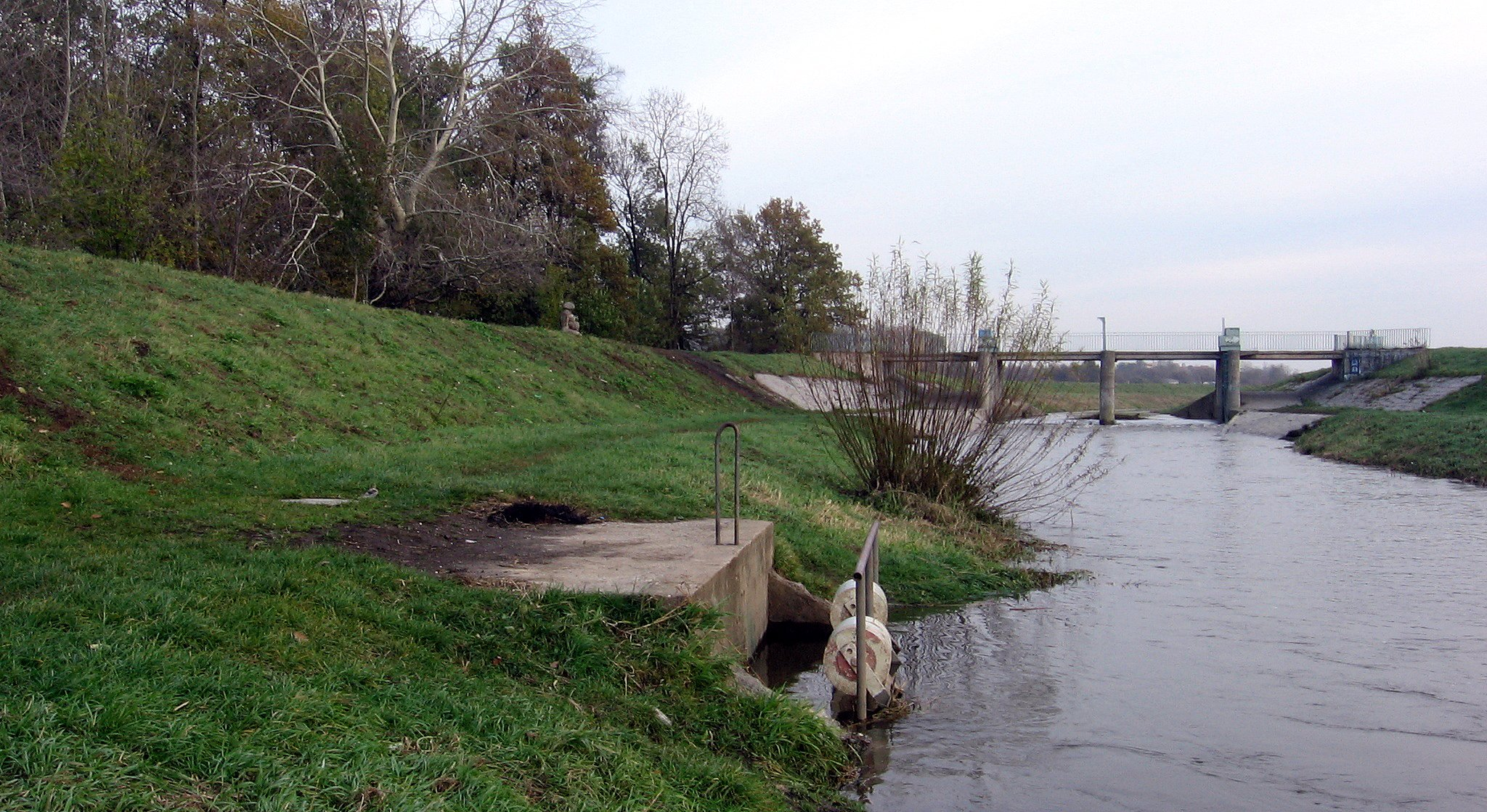
A backwater valve on the estuary of a flux to Ślęza River in Wrocław, Poland

A backwater valve or a backflow valve is a backflow prevention device used to prevent outbound water through a dwelling's drain pipes from re-entering -- "back flowing"—into a home. The valve contains a flap that allows water to exit the home, but closes to prevent the back flow into the home.

== Function ==
Backwater valves commonly activate when a city's sewer lines are unable to handle a large amount of falling precipitation; this puts homes that are tied into the storm lines at risk of having water back flow into them. Backwater occurs when a blockage in a sewer line causes raw sewage to flow back into a building, potentially resulting in flooding and property damage. Proper installation and maintenance of a backwater valve can help prevent such incidents.

== Distinction from backflow preventers ==
There is a big difference between backwater valves and backflow preventers:

- A backwater valve prevents raw sewage from backing up into your home through your toilets, showers, etc.
- A backflow preventer deals with protecting a potable water source from being contaminated by a reverse flow of foul water (ex: isolating your toilet's flush cistern and water supply from the toilet bowl water itself).

== See also ==
- Check valve
- Overflow relief gully
