= Vacuum breaker =

Backflow prevention device

A vacuum breaker is a device that prevents water from being siphoned backward in a direction it is not desired to go. They are commonly placed on a bibcock valve or toilet or urinal flush valve, in which application they can prevent hose or drainage water from back-siphoning into the public drinking water system. This prevents contamination should the public drinking water system's pressure drop. A vacuum breaker is also used in steam distribution systems to prevent collapse of steam coils and pipes by letting in air when the pipe pressure becomes sub-atmospheric.

A vacuum breaker typically contains a plastic disc that is pressed forward by water supply pressure and covers small vent holes. Should the supply pressure drop, the disc springs back opening the vent holes (which let in outside air) and preventing backflow of water.

A more complex valve that accomplishes much the same purpose is the backflow preventer.

Vacuum relief valves are sometimes known as vacuum breakers.

== Types of vacuum breakers ==
An atmospheric vacuum breaker consists of a check valve and an air vent. The devices allow air into the system to prevent a siphon at the point of use.

Hose connection vacuum breakers are installed on faucets and hose bibbs to prevent backflow into the water supply.

Pressure type vacuum breakers are similar to atmospheric vacuum breakers but have a spring-loaded check valve to allow operation of under pressure for long periods of time.

Spill-resistant vacuum breakers utilize a check valve and air vent inlet that allows air to enter before the internal check valve opens, thereby preventing water spillage associated with pressure type vacuum breakers.

== Applications ==
Vacuum breakers can be used in sewage applications as an alternative to a water seal. It utilizes a one-way membrane that acts similar to a check valve. The membrane is sensitive enough to open under the weight of four ounces of water but remains closed when no water is present above to minimize evaporation and eliminate sewer gas odors.

== See also ==
- Atmospheric vacuum breaker
- Check valve
- Pressure vacuum breaker
