= Pot filler =

A pot filler is a moveable tap on a wall above a stove, allowing for the filling of pots or similar cookware. A pot filler usually has two joints to allow them to fold out when in use and in when not in use. They usually have just one temperature and are installed so that people do not have to move between a sink and a stove when filling pots. Pot fillers are typically used in luxurious homes. The use of household pot fillers is part of larger trend of consumers using industrial cooking equipment in their kitchens.
