= Tundish =

Funnel-like device used in plumbing and metal casting

A tundish is a funnel in certain contexts, such as used for filling casks, in smelting and foundry work, or in plumbing to create a siphonic break or visual indication of flow. The word tundish originally referred to a shallow wooden dish with an outlet channel, fitting into the bunghole of a tun or cask and forming a kind of funnel for filling it. These were originally used in brewing.

In general, any tundish will accept flow and store a small amount of material, while dispensing material elsewhere, similar to a funnel. In contrast to a funnel, the purpose is generally to regulate flow and achieve a steadier output with intermittent inputs, and the tundish typically will take on a different shape.

== Plumbing ==
The term tundish is used in plumbing, where a funnel or hopper is filled by an outlet pipe above it. This is often provided for intermittent overflows, or where an air gap is required, to avoid back-contamination.

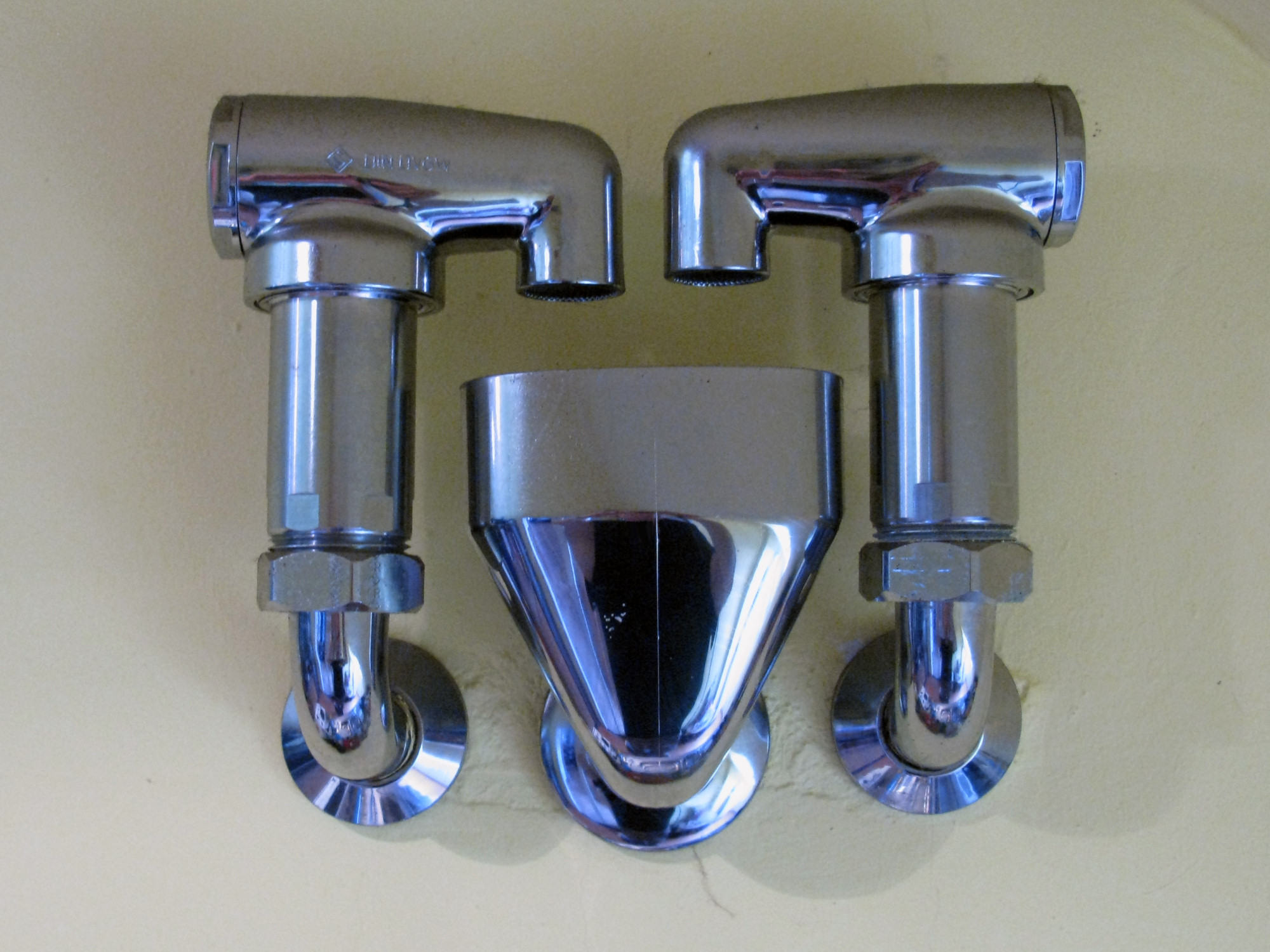
An atmospheric vacuum breaker with a tundish

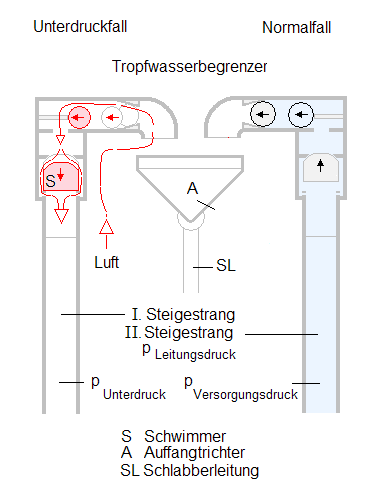
Functional schematic (labelled in German)

== Metal casting ==
In metal casting, a tundish is a broad, open container with one or more holes in the bottom. It is used to feed molten metal into an ingot mould to avoid splashing and give a smoother flow. The tundish allows a reservoir of metal to feed the casting machine while ladles are switched, thus acting as a buffer of hot metal, as well as smoothing out flow, regulating metal feed to the moulds and cleaning the metal. Metallic remains left inside a tundish are known as tundish skulls and need to be removed, typically by mechanical means (scraping, cutting). A casting tundish is lined with refractory bricks specific to the liquid metal which is being cast. A tundish preheater may improve performance by heating the refractory before pouring metal, and may allow removal of molten oxide and skull material while preheating.
