= Hydrostatic loop =

A hydrostatic loop, though not often used in plumbing practice, is an arrangement of pipes formed into a vertical loop to prevent backflow of water within the plumbing potable water system. Since a siphon has a maximum height that it can work (about 33 feet), a hydrostatic loop is built higher than 33 feet. There are several ways to prevent siphonage and an undesirable backflow of the water in a plumbing system.

- Vented loops

== See also ==
- backflow prevention
- Pressure vacuum breaker
- Double check valve
- Chemigation valve
- Reduced pressure zone device
- Atmospheric vacuum breaker
