= Atmospheric vacuum breaker =

Backflow prevention device

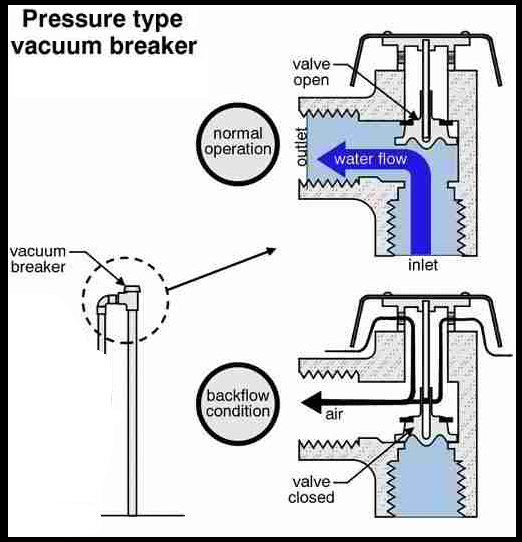
Diagram of an atmospheric vacuum breaker in both working states

An atmospheric vacuum breaker (AVB) is a backflow prevention device used in plumbing to prevent backflow of non-potable liquids into the drinking water system.

It is usually constructed of brass and resembles a right-angle elbow with a hood on its top to allow air to enter the water system if a siphon is formed. Inside this elbow is a poppet valve that is held "up" by the water pressure found in the system, closing the air entrance to the device. If the pressure in the "upstream side" is reduced to atmospheric pressure or below, the poppet valve drops and allows air to enter the system, breaking the siphon. These devices, since they work on atmospheric principles, cannot be installed in an enclosure containing air contaminants. Those contaminants could be drawn into the device, thus fouling the pipes. AVBs must be installed a minimum of about six inches (150 mm) above the highest usage point in the system (i.e. sprinkler, drip emitter, etc.). Underground installation of AVBs is entirely ineffectual in providing backflow protection as groundwater in the underground vault could be drawn into the water system, contaminating it.

The AVB can be used in high hazard situations but not with continuous pressure, as the poppet would likely stick and the AVB would no longer function properly. A shutoff valve should never be placed downstream of any AVB, as this would result in continuous pressure on the AVB. The AVB is not a testable device.

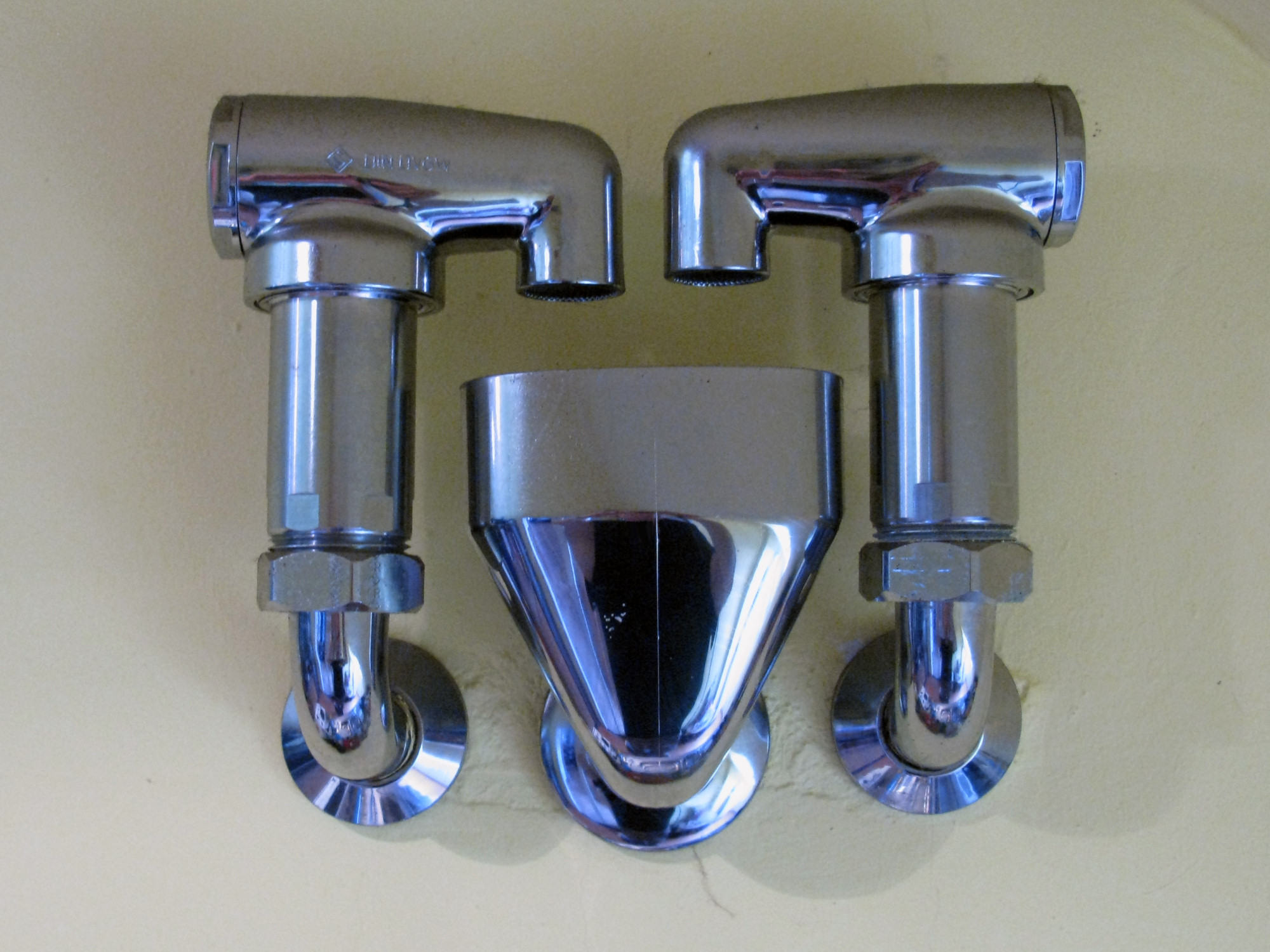
Atmospheric vacuum breaker with a tundish

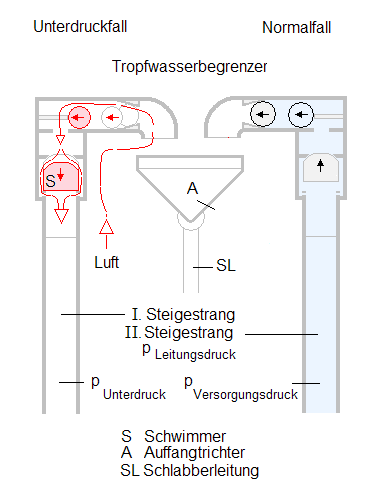
Functional schematic (labelled in German)

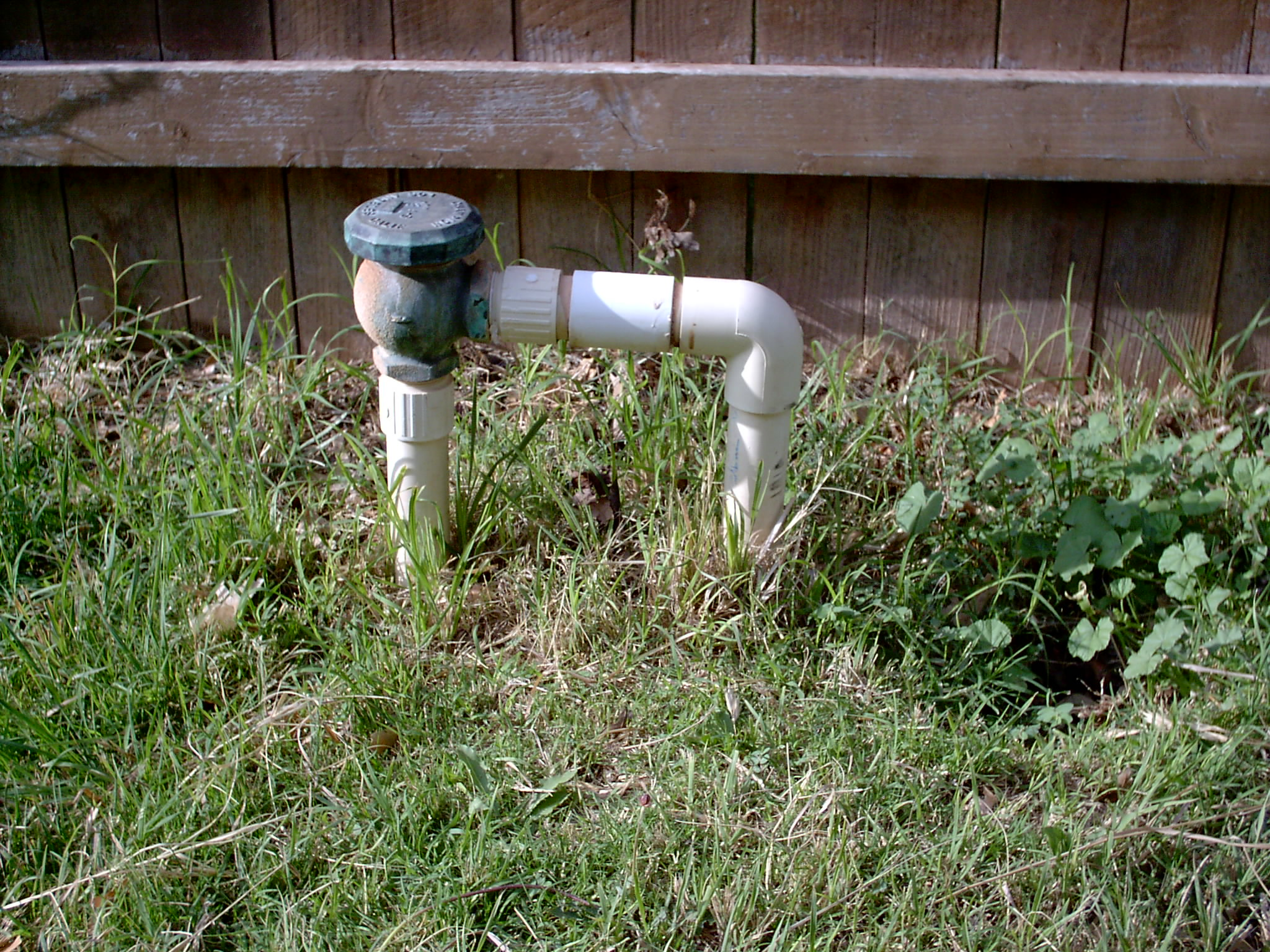
One-inch brass atmospheric vacuum breaker mounted on PVC Pipe

== See also ==
- Air gap
- Chemigation valve
- Double check valve
- Hydrostatic loop
- Pressure vacuum breaker
- Reduced pressure zone device
- Vacuum breaker
