= Backflow =

Unwanted reverse flow of water

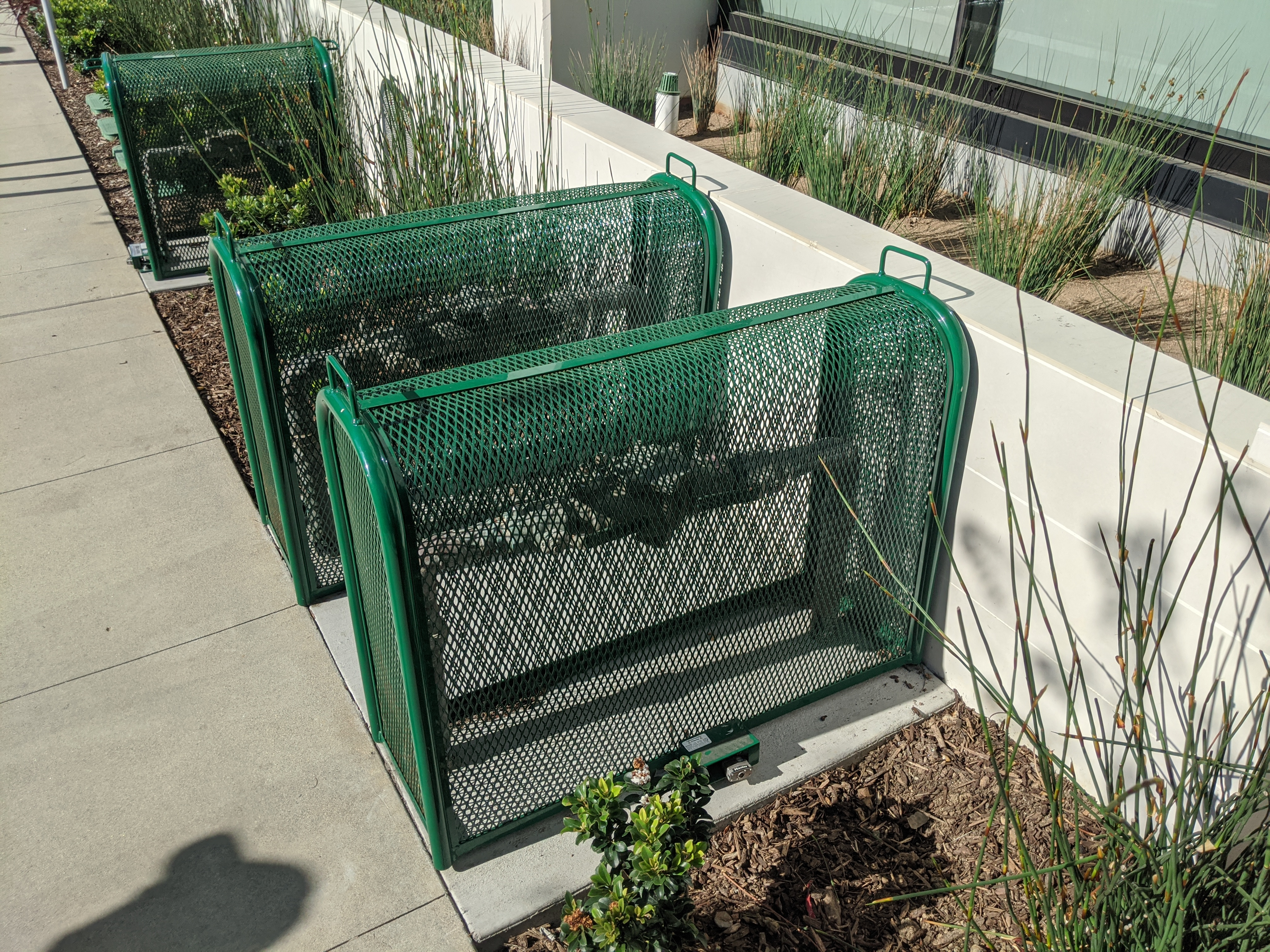
Backflow preventer in anti-vandal cages in San Diego, CA

Backflow is a term in plumbing for an unwanted flow of water in the reverse direction. It can be a serious health risk for the contamination of potable water supplies with foul water. In the most obvious case, a toilet flush cistern and its water supply must be isolated from the toilet bowl. For this reason, building codes mandate a series of measures and backflow prevention devices to prevent backflow.

== Causes ==
Backflow occurs for one of two reasons, either back pressure or back siphonage.

Back pressure is the result of a higher pressure in the system than in its supply, i.e. the system pressure has been increased by some means. This may occur in unvented heating systems, where thermal expansion increases the pressure.

Back siphonage is the result of supply pressure being lowered below that of the system. This may occur when a supply is interrupted or drained down.

== Risk of contamination ==
The precise measures required to prevent backflow depend on the risk of contamination, i.e. the condition of the water in the connected system. In the United Kingdom this is categorized into different risk levels:

- Category 1: No risk. Potable water
- Category 2: Aesthetic quality affected, e.g. water which may have been heated
- Category 3: Slight hazard from substances of low toxicity, e.g. cold water storage tanks
- Category 4: Significant hazard, e.g. pesticides
- Category 5: Serious health risk, e.g. human waste

== Measures to avoid backflow ==
Backflow prevention must be automatic, and manually operated valves are not usually acceptable.

=== Check valves ===
Automatic check valves are required to prevent back pressure. Regulations for these check valves specify the design capabilities of the valve used, according to the hazard. Category 2 contamination may be prevented by a single check valve, but category 3 requires a double check valve (these are manufactured as a convenient single unit, or even integrated into tap (faucet) fittings). Category 5 requires an air gap, not merely a valve. A recent introduction to the UK has been the Reduced Pressure Zone (RPZ) valve, a form of double check valve where the intervening zone is drained and normally kept empty. If the downstream valve leaks and permits backflow, this will drain out through the vent rather than building up pressure against the upstream valve. These valves are complex, requiring certified installation and annual checks. They are used for category 4 systems, such as fire sprinklers where the system has an antifreeze additive.

=== Air gaps ===
Back siphonage may be prevented by use of a vertical air gap. This may be a small gap, such as provided by a tundish (a combined overflow spout and catch funnel) or a large gap, such as a basin tap being above the maximum level of the water in the basin. Standards for these air gaps group them by the amount of separation they provide and their acceptability for the various risk categories. The size of the acceptable gap also depends on the capacity of the incoming supply, such that a stuck-open flow cannot overfill the cistern and close the gap.

Air gaps may also protect against back pressure, and are generally favoured for this. However most air gaps also limit the system pressure that may be transmitted across them. In most cases, they replace mains pressure with the pressure of that from a raised gravity cistern.

Common examples of an air gap in domestic plumbing are:

- Taps above washbasins
- Cold water cisterns, where the float valve outlet must be above the overflow water level. The previous practice of taking a "silencing tube" from the float valve to under the water level is no longer acceptable. Under some plumbing codes. Such silencing may still be acceptable if it is a soft collapsible tube which cannot syphon.
- Hand-held showers must have their hoses fastened such that the shower head cannot rest below the water level in a bath or basin.

== Sanitary sewer backflow ==
Backwater sanitary valves (also known as "check valves" or "backwater valves") are also often referred to as "backflow preventers" They are intended to prevent backflow of sewage on the sanitary sewer line during a flood or sewer blockage, and have no connection with potable water.

Also sewage lifting stations provide comprehensive protection against sewer backflow. They pump the water above the backpressure level into the sewer. Even when the sewer is completely full.

== Standards ==
The American Society of Mechanical Engineers (ASME) publishes the following Standard on:

- A112.18.3 – Performance Requirements for Backflow Protection Devices and Systems in Plumbing Fixture Fittings

== See also ==
- Upstream contamination
