= Chemigation valve =

Sometimes called a check valve or a backflow preventer, a chemigation valve is an apparatus designed to protect water supplies from agricultural chemicals used during chemigation, the application of chemicals such as fertilizers and pesticides through irrigation water. Most chemigation valves consist of a spring-loaded check valve, a low pressure drain, an air and vacuum relief valve, and an injection port for introducing the chemicals downstream of the check valve. Many chemigation valves also have a 4-inch inspection port so that a person can reach inside and feel if the check valve is still functional. Some governments require the use of two chemigation valves installed in series if hazardous chemicals are to be injected.

The following policies require or encourage the installation of these valves:

Texas State law Chapter 344.73 in Subchapter D - 1.(b)

"An irrigation system which adds any chemical is considered to be a 'high health hazard'. Such an irrigation system must not be connected to any potable water supply except through a reduced pressure principle backflow prevention assembly."

Florida's Department of Agriculture and Consumer Services Water Quality/Quantity Best Management Practices for Florida Specialty Fruit and Nut Crops p. 20 specifies that:

"Backflow prevention should include a check valve between the irrigation pump and the injection device to prevent backward flow; a low-pressure drain to prevent seepage past the check valve; a vacuum relief valve to ensure that a siphon cannot develop; and a check valve on the injection line."

== See also ==
- Air gap
- Hydrostatic loop
- Pressure vacuum breaker
- Double check valve
- Reduced Pressure Principle BFP
- Atmospheric vacuum breaker
