= Pressure-balanced valve =

Provides water at nearly constant temperature

A pressure-balanced valve provides water at nearly constant temperature to a shower or bathtub, despite pressure fluctuations in either the hot or cold supply lines.

== Mechanism ==
If, for example, someone flushes a toilet while the shower is in use, the fixture suddenly draws a significant amount of cold water from the common supply line, causing a pressure drop. In the absence of a compensating mechanism, the relatively higher pressure in the hot water supply line will cause the shower temperature to rise just as suddenly, possibly reaching an uncomfortable or even dangerous level. Conversely, if someone opens a hot water faucet elsewhere, the relatively higher pressure in the cold water supply line will cause the shower temperature to drop suddenly. This is described in US patent 3674048.

The pressure-balanced shower valve compensates for changes in water pressure. It has a diaphragm or piston inside that reacts to relative changes in either hot or cold water pressure to maintain balanced pressure. As water pressure drops on one supply line, the valve reduces the pressure in the other supply line to match. A side effect of this is that the pressure and flow at the shower head or tub spigot will drop twice as much as if only one supply line had been affected, but without a large temperature change. There are ball bearings in the valves to regulate forces.

The use of pressure-balanced valves can prevent scalding injuries, in particular to the elderly, the infirm, to children and infants. Based on that, some municipalities require by building codes to have it installed.

== See also ==
- Thermostatic mixing valve
- Atmospheric vacuum breaker
