= Tap (valve) =

Valve controlling the release of a liquid or gas

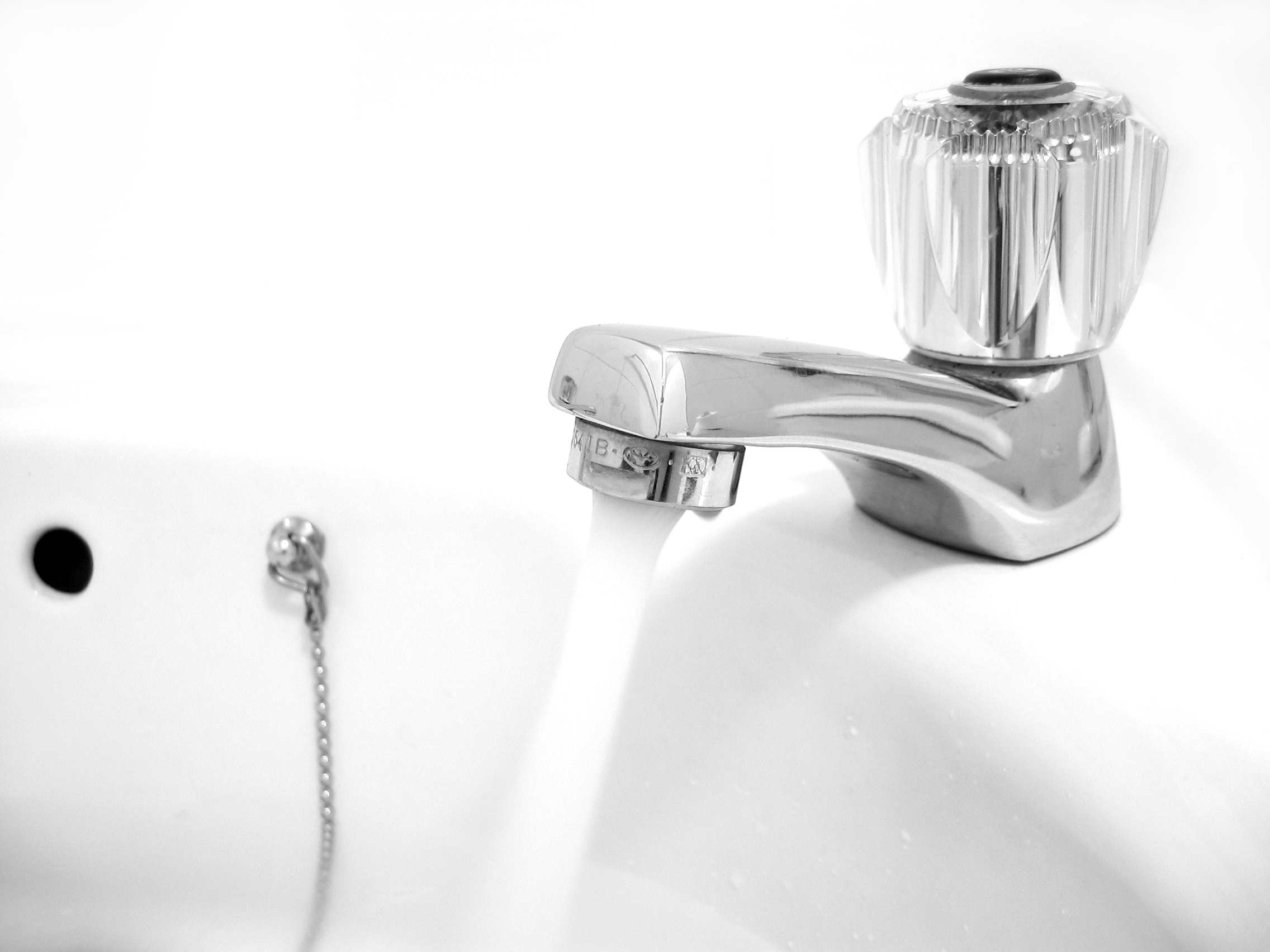
Interior water taps with aerators are commonly found in the bathroom and kitchen.

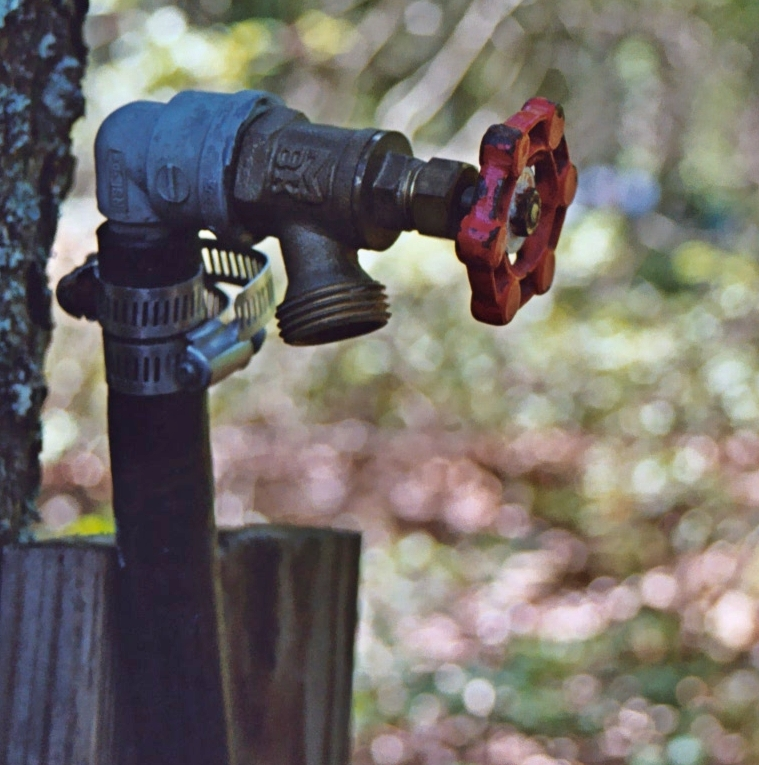
Exterior spigot (also known as a "shut-off valve", "hose hydrant", "hose bib", or "silcock")

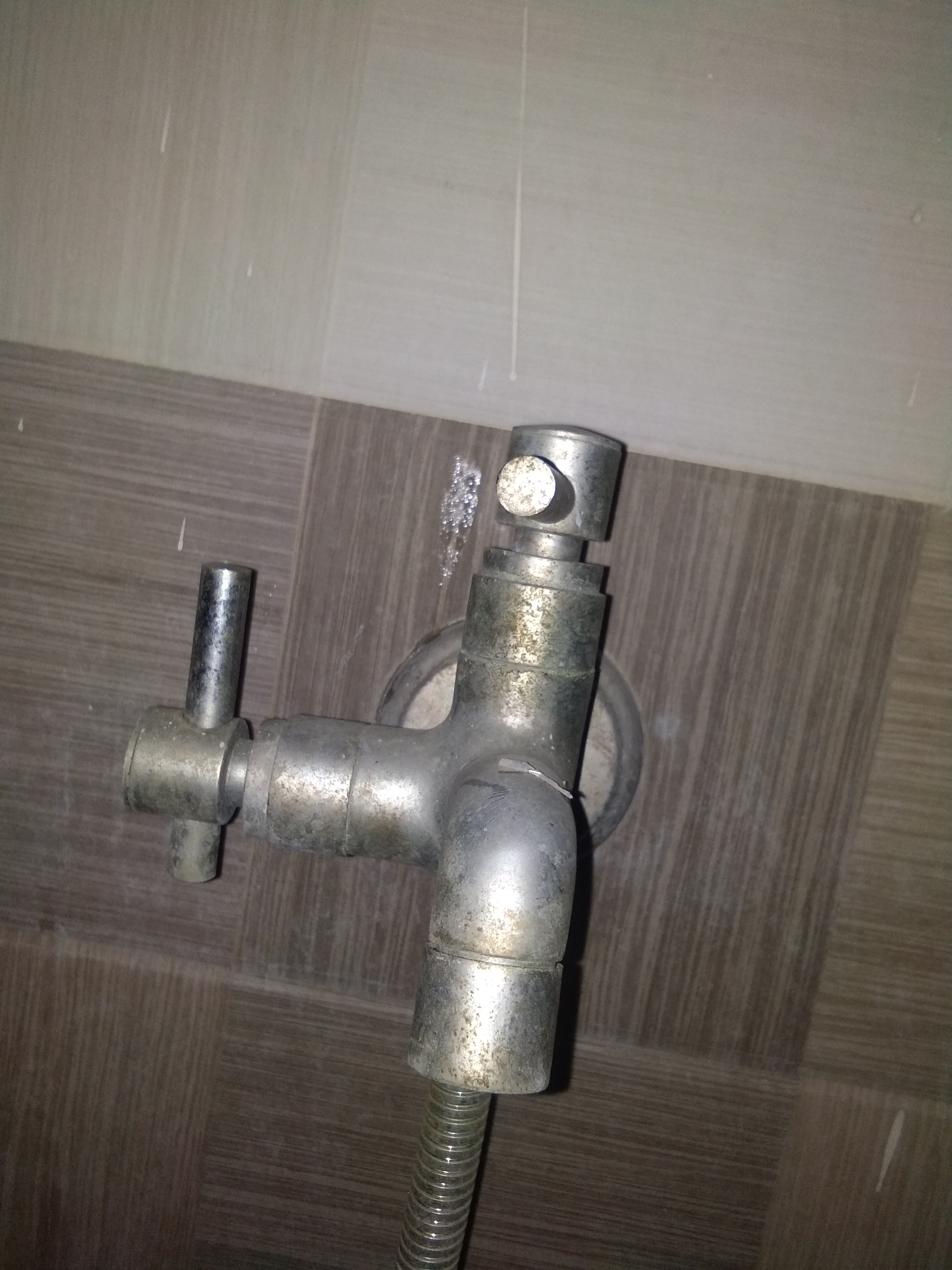
Two-way water tap used in restroom

A tap (also spigot or faucet: see usage variations) is a valve controlling the release of a fluid.

== Nomenclature ==
=== United Kingdom ===
- Tap is used in the United Kingdom and most of the Commonwealth for any everyday type of valve, particularly the fittings that control water supply to bathtubs and sinks.

=== United States ===
- Faucet is the most common term in the US, similar in use to "tap" in British English, e.g. "water faucet" (although the term "tap" is also used in the US).
- Spigot is used by professionals in the trade (such as plumbers), and typically refers to an outdoor fixture.
- Silcock (and sillcock), same as "spigot", referring to a "cock" (as in stopcock and petcock) that penetrates a foundation sill.
- Bib, bibcock, or hose bib, usually a freeze-resistant version of a "spigot".
- Wall hydrant, same as "hose bib".
- Tap generally refers to a keg or barrel tap. It also appears as a descriptor in "tap water" (i.e. water purified for domestic use). A single temperature tap is commonly found in a commercial or public restroom where the temperature of the water will be controlled by a separate temperature regulating valve that mixes hot and cold water. The regulating valve may be under the handwashing sink or in a separate mechanical room or service closet. These single taps are less prone to breakage from heavy use or vandalism.

== Types ==
=== Liquid ===
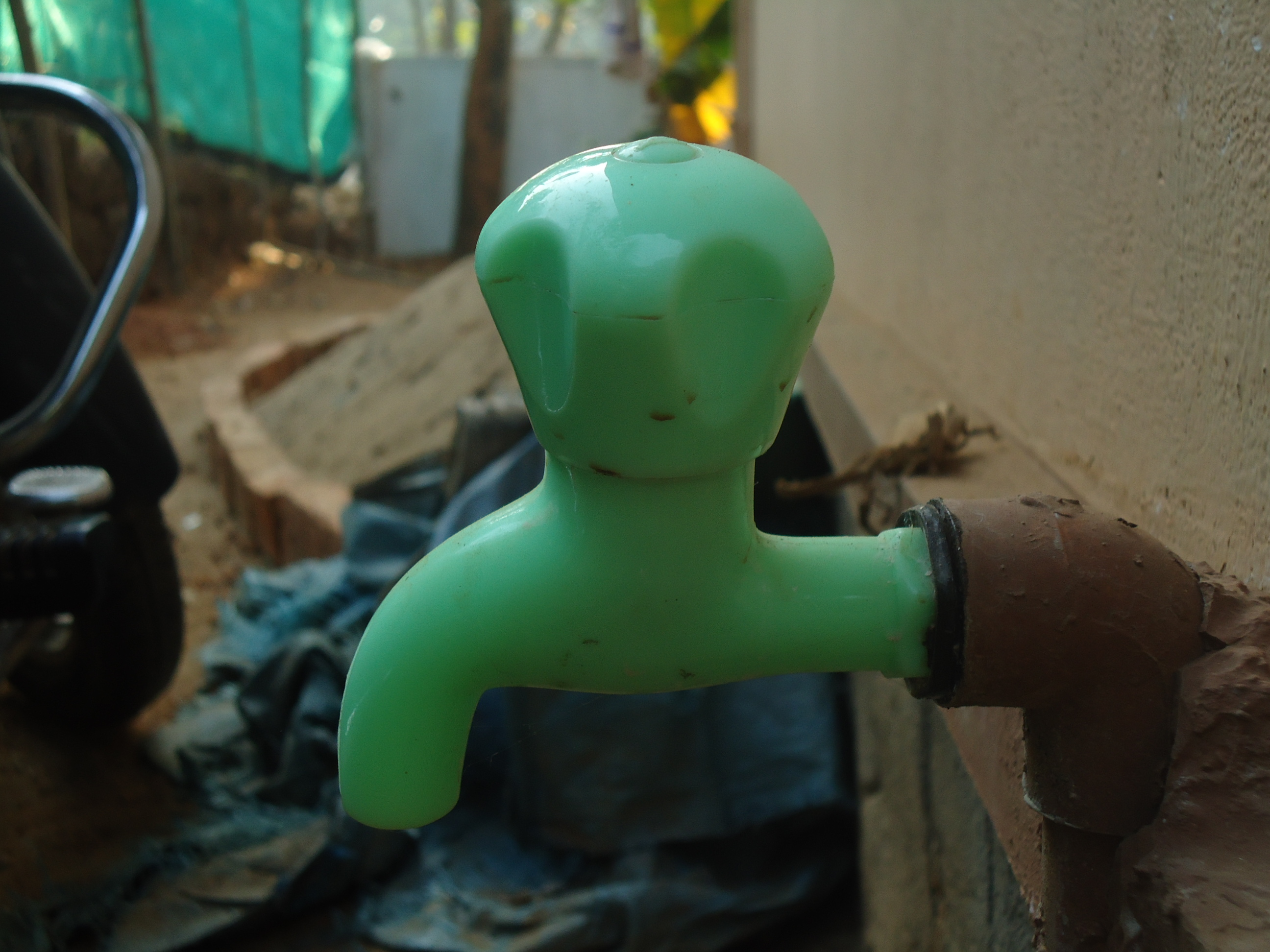
Plastic taps are widely used in India due to low costs.

Water for baths, sinks and basins can be provided by separate hot and cold high-pressure taps, derived from Edward Chrimes's of Rotherham, 1845 invention; this arrangement is common in older installations, particularly in public washrooms/lavatories and utility rooms/laundries. In kitchens and bathrooms, mixer taps are commonly used. In this case, hot and cold water from the two valves is mixed before reaching the outlet, allowing the water to emerge at any temperature between that of the hot and cold water supplies. Mixer taps were invented by Thomas Campbell of Saint John, New Brunswick, and patented in 1880.

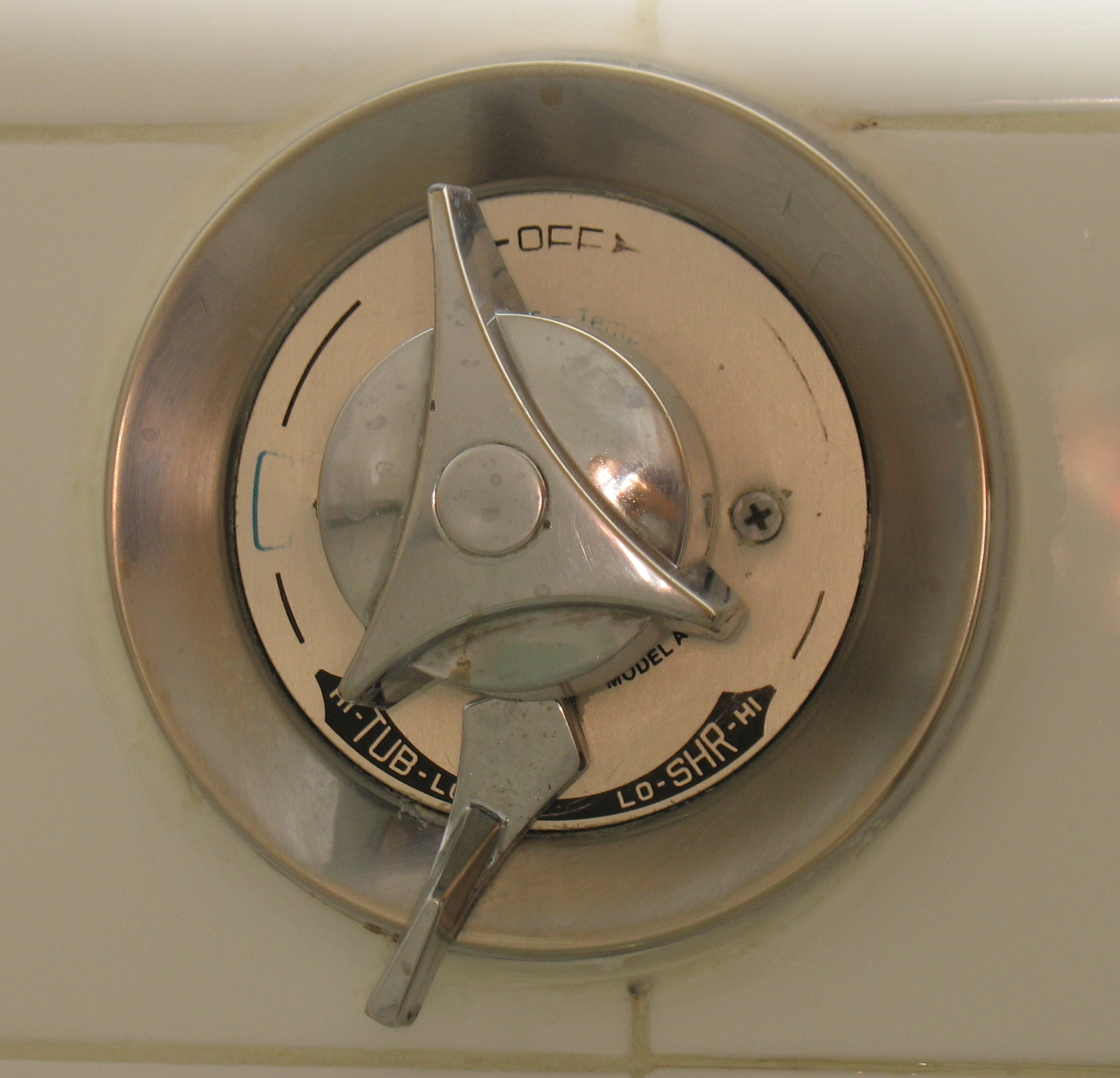
A North American style mixing valve uses a center handle to control temperature (increased by counter-clockwise rotation). Below it is a lever controlling flow rate and routing, stopping flow when centered and sending water to the tub when positioned to the left, the shower to the right.

For baths and showers, mixer taps frequently incorporate some sort of pressure balancing feature so that the hot/cold mixture ratio will not be affected by transient changes in the pressure of one or other of the supplies. This helps avoid scalding or uncomfortable chilling as other water loads occur (such as the flushing of a toilet). Rather than two separate valves, mixer taps frequently use a single, more complex, valve controlled by a single handle (single handle mixer). The handle moves up and down to control the amount of water flow and from side to side to control the temperature of the water. Especially for baths and showers, the latest designs are thermostatic mixing valves that do this using a built-in thermostat, and can be mechanical or electronic. There are also taps with color LEDs to show the temperature of the water.

When two pipes are installed, the hot tap generally has a red indicator while the cold tap generally has a blue or green indicator. In the United States, the taps are frequently also labeled with an "H" or "C". In countries with Romance languages, the letters "C" for hot and "F" for cold are used (from French "chaud"/Italian "caldo"/Spanish "caliente" (hot) and French "froid"/Italian "freddo"/Spanish "frio" (cold)). Portuguese would use Q (for "quente", hot) and F. This can create confusion for English-speaking visitors. Mixer taps may have a red-blue stripe or arrows indicating which side will give hot and which cold.

In most countries, there is a standard arrangement of hot/cold taps. For example, in the United States and many other countries, the hot tap is on the left by building code requirements. Many installations exist where this standard has been ignored (called "crossed connections" by plumbers). Mis-assembly of some single-valve mixer taps will exchange hot and cold even if the fixture has been plumbed correctly.

In the United States, the Americans with Disabilities Act provide requirements for faucets, such as requiring less than five pounds of force to operate, and requiring that the user does not have to twist their wrist.

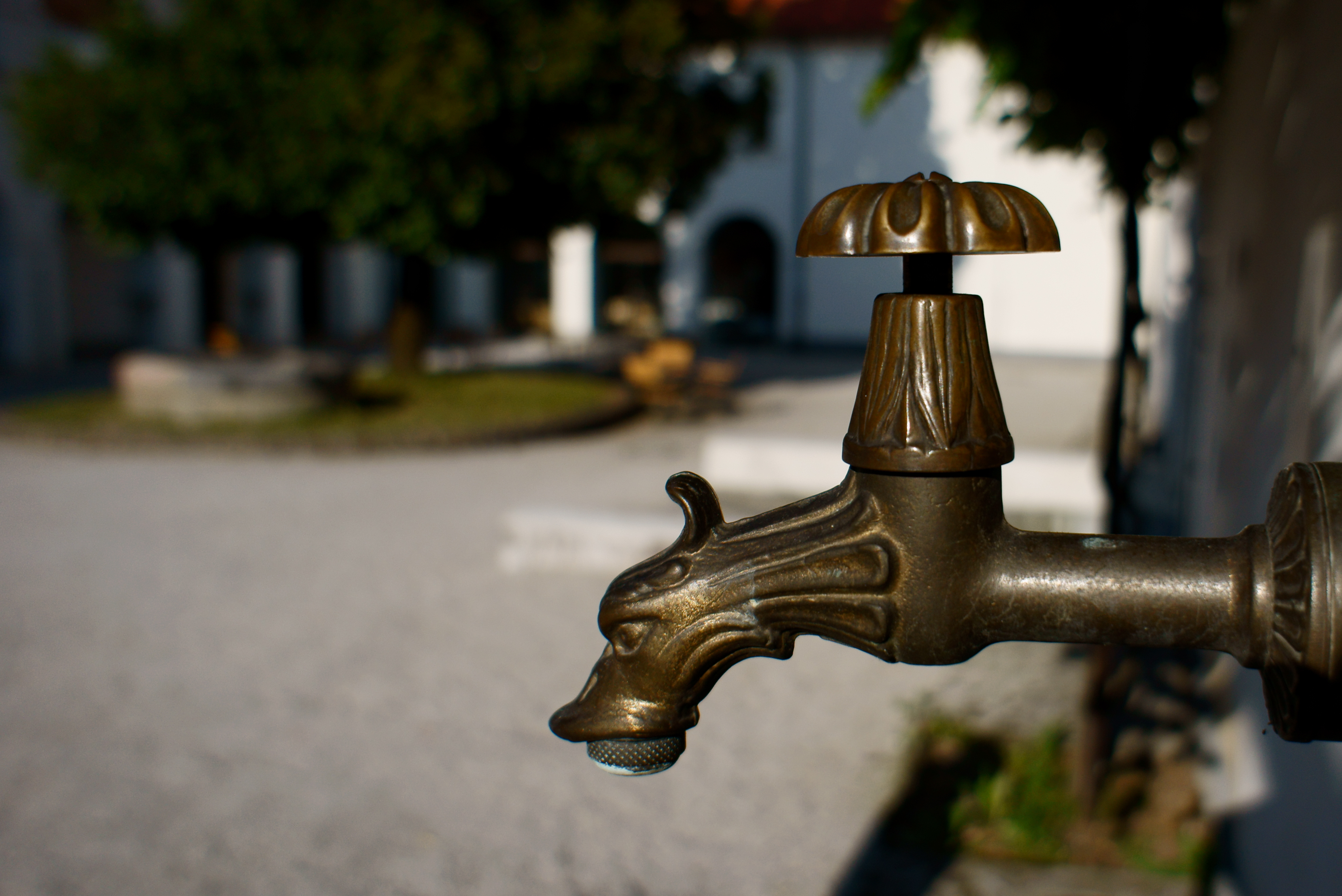
Old metal taps were often used as decoration, as is this one at Fužine Castle in Slovenia

Most handles in homes are fastened to the valve shafts with screws, but on many commercial and industrial applications they are fitted with a removable key called a "loose key", "water key", or "sillcock key", which has a square peg and a square-ended key to turn off and on the water; the "loose key" can be removed to prevent vandals from turning on the water. Before the "loose key" was invented it was common for some landlords or caretakers to take off the handle of a tap, which had teeth that would meet up with the gears on the valve shaft. This tooth and cog system is still used on most modern taps. "Loose keys" may also be found outside homes to prevent passers-by from using them.

Taps are normally connected to the water supply by means of a "swivel tap connector", which is attached to the end of the water pipe using a soldered or compression fitting, and has a large nut to screw onto the threaded "tail" of the tap, which hangs down underneath the bath, basin or sink. A fibre washer (which expands when wet, aiding the seal) is used between the connector and the tap tail. Tap tails are normally 1/2 " or 12 mm in diameter for sinks and 3/4 " or 19 mm for baths, although continental Europe sometimes uses a 3/8 " (still imperial) size. The same connection method is used for a ballcock.

The term tap is widely used to describe the valve used to dispense draft beer from a keg, whether gravity feed or pressurized.

=== Gas ===
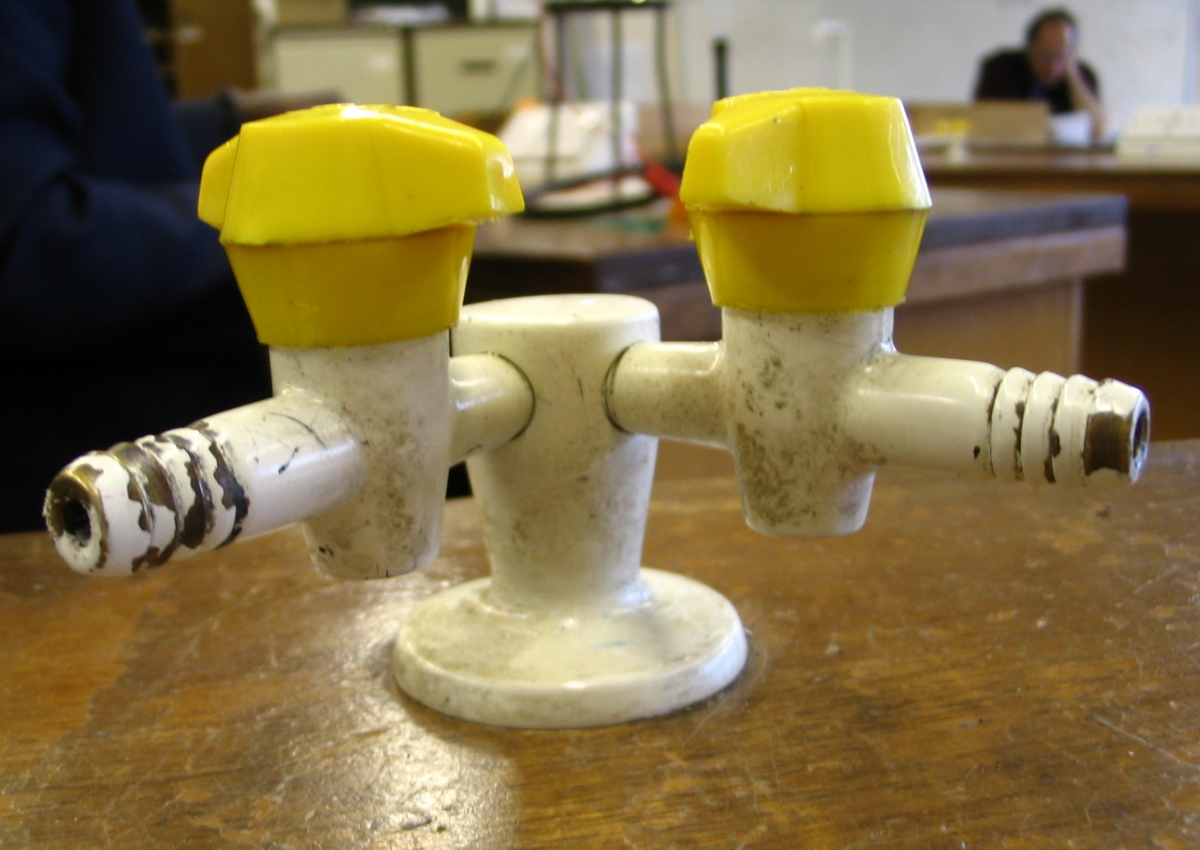
Gas taps

A gas tap is a specific form of ball valve used in residential, commercial, and laboratory applications for coarse control of the release of fuel gases (such as natural gas, coal gas, and syngas). Like all ball valves its handle will parallel the gas line when open and be perpendicular when closed, making for easy visual identification of its status.

== Physics ==
Water and gas taps have adjustable flow: gate valves are more progressive; ball valves more coarse, typically used in on-off applications. Turning a valve knob or lever adjusts flow by varying the aperture of the control device in the valve assembly. The result when opened in any degree is a choked flow. Its rate is independent of the viscosity or temperature of the fluid or gas in the pipe, and depends only weakly on the supply pressure, so that flow rate is stable at a given setting. At intermediate flow settings the pressure at the valve restriction drops nearly to zero from the Venturi effect; in water taps, this causes the water to boil momentarily at room temperature as it passes through the restriction. Bubbles of cool water vapor form and collapse at the restriction, causing the familiar hissing sound At very low flow settings, the viscosity of the water becomes important and the pressure drop (and hissing noise) vanish; at full flow settings, parasitic drag in the pipes becomes important and the water again becomes silent.

== Mechanisms ==
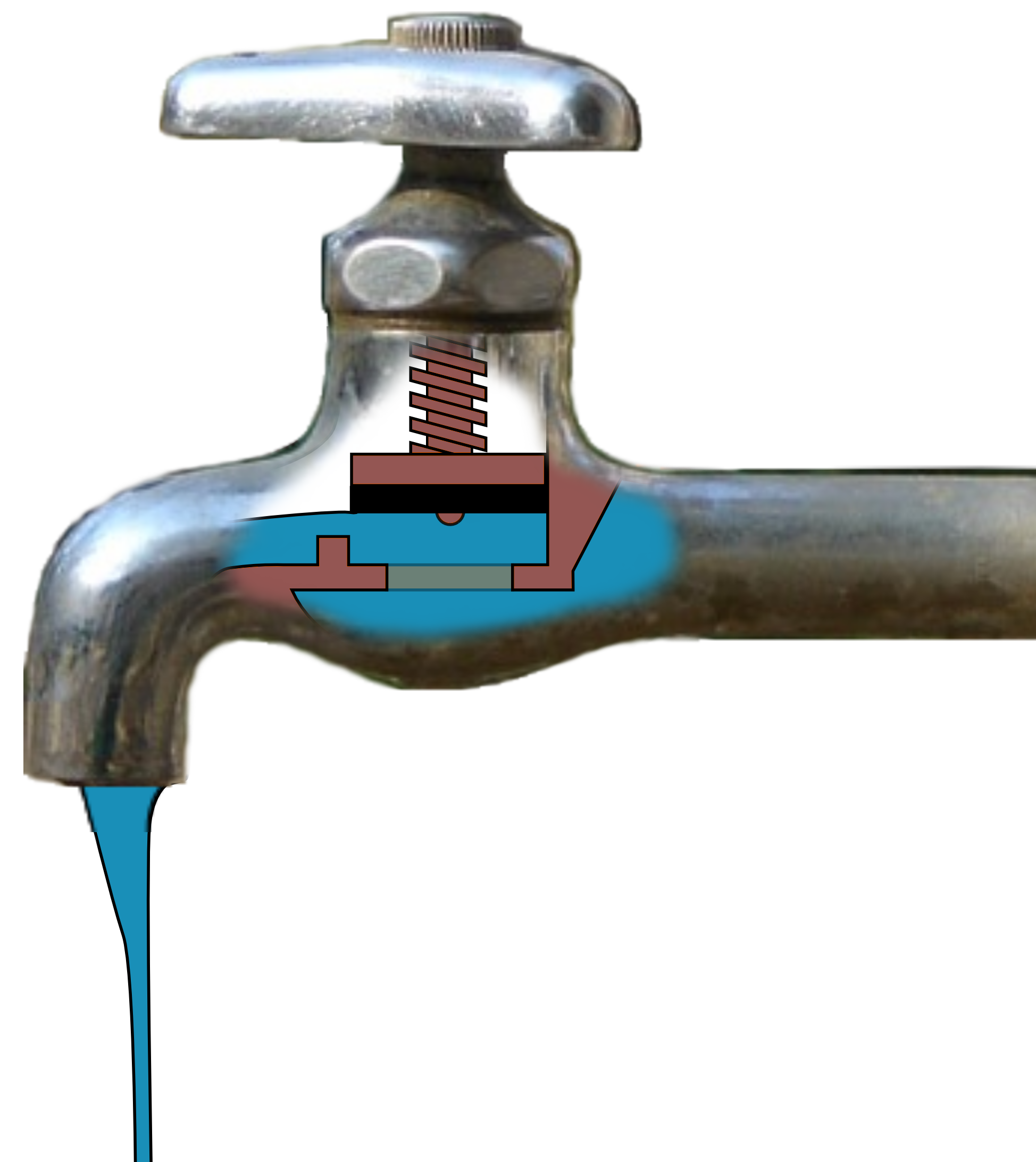
Tap mechanism

The first screw-down tap mechanism was patented and manufactured by the Rotherham brass founders Guest and Chrimes in 1845. Most older taps use a soft rubber or neoprene washer which is screwed down onto a valve seat in order to stop the flow. This is called a "globe valve" in engineering and, while it gives a leak-proof seal and good fine adjustment of flow, both the rubber washer and the valve seat are subject to wear (and for the seat, also corrosion) over time, so that eventually no tight seal is formed in the closed position, resulting in a leaking tap. The washer can be replaced and the valve seat resurfaced (at least a few times), but globe valves are never maintenance-free.

Also, the tortuous S-shaped path the water is forced to follow offers a significant obstruction to the flow. For high pressure domestic water systems this does not matter, but for low pressure systems where flow rate is important, such as a shower fed by a storage tank, a "stop tap" or, in engineering terms, a "gate valve" is preferred.

Gate valves use a metal wedge with a circular face, usually the same diameter as the pipe, which is screwed into place perpendicularly to the flow, cutting it off. There is little resistance to flow when the tap is fully open, but this type of tap rarely gives a perfect seal when closed. In the UK this type of tap normally has a wheel-shaped handle rather than a crutch or capstan handle.

Cone valves or ball valves are another alternative. These are commonly found as the service shut-off valves in more-expensive water systems and usually found in gas taps (and, incidentally, the cask beer taps referred to above). They can be identified by their range of motion—only 90°—between fully open and closed. Usually, when the handle is in line with the pipe the valve is open, and when the handle is across the pipe it is closed. But it could move in either direction CW or CCW perpendicular to the pipe. S=shut and O=open. A cone valve consists of a shallowly tapering cone in a tight-fitting socket placed across the flow of the fluid. In UK English this is usually known as a taper-plug cock. A ball valve uses a spherical ball instead. In either case, a hole through the cone or ball allows the fluid to pass if it is lined up with the openings in the socket through which the fluid enters and leaves; turning the cone using the handle rotates the passage away, presenting the fluid with the unbroken surface of the cone through which it cannot pass. Valves of this type using a cylinder rather than a cone are sometimes encountered, but using a cone allows a tight fit to be made even with moderate manufacturing tolerances. The ball in ball valves rotates within plastic (usually PTFE) seats.

Hands free infrared proximity sensors are replacing the standard valve. Thermostatically controlled electronic dual-purpose mixing or diverting valves are used within industrial applications to automatically provide liquids as required.

Foot controlled valves are installed within laboratory and healthcare/hospitals, as well as in industrial settings where extremely dirty hands operating taps might leave residues on them.

Modern taps often have aerators at the tip to limit water flow and introduce air in the form of bubbles to reduce splashing. Without an aerator, water usually flows out of the tap in one big stream. An aerator spreads the water flow into many small droplets. In sanitary settings such as hospitals or laboratories "laminar flow devices" are used in place of aerators. Laminar flow devices restrict flow and direct the water into a smooth stream without introducing the surrounding air which could contain hazardous bacteria or particles.

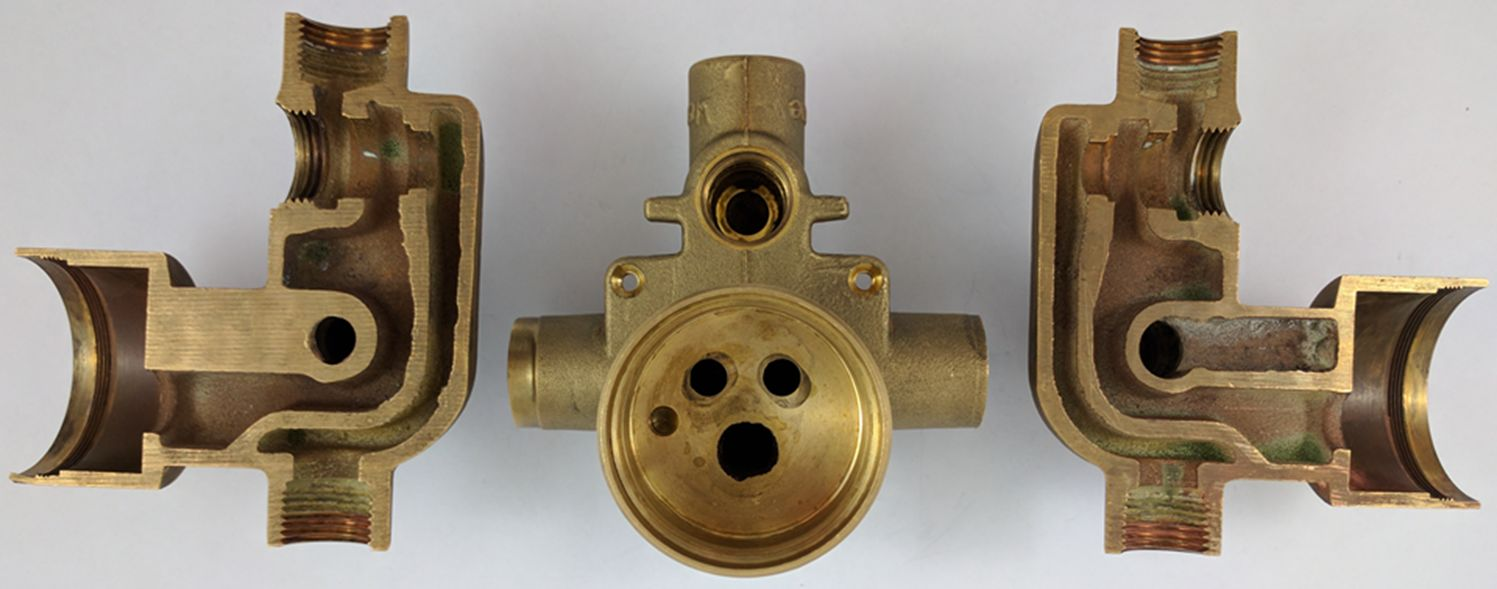
Cross section of a shower tap

Modern bathroom and kitchen taps often use ceramic or plastic surfaces sliding against other spring-loaded ceramic surfaces or plastic washers. These taps exploit the uniquely low value of the coefficient of friction of 2 ceramic surfaces in contact, especially in the presence of water as a lubricant. These taps tend to require far less maintenance than traditional globe valves, and when maintenance is required the entire interior of the valve is usually replaced, often as a single pre-assembled cartridge.

Of three manufacturers in North America, Moen and American Standard use cartridges (Moen's being O-ring based, American Standard's being ceramic), while Delta uses rubber seats facing the cartridges. Each design has its advantages: Moen cartridges tend to be easiest to find, American Standard cartridges have nearly infinite lifespan in sediment-free municipal water, and Delta's rubber seats tend to be most forgiving of sediment in well water.

=== Backflow prevention ===
Most US jurisdictions require hose spigots, hose bibs, and wall hydrants to have a vacuum breaker or backflow preventer, so that water cannot return through the spigot from the hose. This prevents contamination of the building or public water system should there be a pressure drop. In the UK, water regulations require a double check valve; this is often incorporated within the body of the tap itself.

== ASME A112 standards on plumbing materials and equipment ==
The American Society of Mechanical Engineers (ASME) publishes several Standards on plumbing. Some are:

- ASME A112.6.3 – Floor and Trench Drains
- ASME A112.6.4 – Roof, Deck, and Balcony Drains
- ASME A112.18.1/CSA B125.1 – Plumbing Supply Fittings
- ASME A112.19.1/CSA B45.2 – Enameled Cast Iron and Enameled Steel Plumbing Fixtures
- ASME A112.19.2/CSA B45.1 – Ceramic Plumbing Fixtures

Brass is commonly used in the manufacture of taps because of its durability and resistance to corrosion.

== See also ==
- Automatic faucet – Sensor-operated water outlet
- Drip irrigation – Irrigation system
- Irrigation – Agricultural artificial application of water to land
- Shower head
