= Backflow prevention device =

Device that prevents undesired water flow

In this situation, dirty water from the hillside pool will back-siphon or back-flow down the hosepipe and into the clean water tank. To prevent this from happening, the house's external tap should be fitted with a backflow prevention device.

A backflow prevention device is used to protect potable water supplies from contamination or pollution due to backflow.

In water distribution systems, water is normally maintained at a significant pressure to enable water to flow from the tap, shower, or other fixture. Water pressure may fail or be reduced when a water main bursts, pipes freeze, or there is unexpectedly high demand on the water system (for example, when several fire hydrants are opened). Reduced pressure in the pipe may allow contaminated water from the soil, from storage, or from other sources to be drawn up into the system.

== Terminology ==
Backflow means the undesirable reversal of flow of a liquid, gas, or suspended solid into the potable water supply; a backflow preventer is designed to keep this from happening. Points at which a potable water system connects with a non-potable water system are called cross connections. Such connections occur naturally in appliances such as clothes washers and dishwashers, but they must be carefully designed and installed to prevent backflow. Another common location for a backflow preventer is the connection of a fire sprinkler system to a water main, to prevent pressurized water from flowing from the fire suppression system into the public water supply.

Back-siphonage occurs when higher pressure fluids, gases, or suspended solids move to an area of lower pressure fluids. For example, when a drinking straw is used to consume a beverage, suction reduces the pressure of fluid inside the straw, causing liquid to move from the cup to inside the straw and then into the drinker's mouth. A significant drop of pressure in a water delivery system creates a similar suction, pulling possibly undesirable material into the system. This is an example of an indirect cross-connection.

Back-pressure occurs for example when air is blown through the straw and bubbles begin to erupt at the submerged end. If, instead of air, natural gas had been forced into a potable water tank, the gas in turn could be carried to a kitchen faucet. This is an example of a direct cross-connection, with undesirable material being pushed into the system.

Back pressure can force an undesirable contaminant to enter potable water piping. Sources of back pressure may be boilers, heat exchanging equipment, power washing equipment, fire sprinklers, or pumps in the water distribution system. In some cases there may be an almost continuous risk of overcoming the static water pressure in the piping. To reduce the risk of contamination, a backflow preventer can be fitted. A backflow preventer is also important when potentially toxic chemicals are used, for instance for commercial/industrial descaling of boilers, or when chemical bleaches are used for residential power washing.

A closely related device is the backwater valve, which is designed to prevent sewage from backing up into a building and causing basement flooding.

== Preventive devices ==
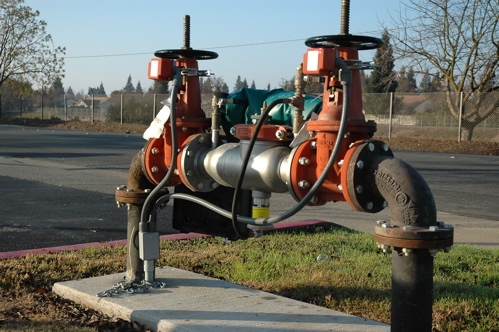
Backflow prevention device

The simplest, most reliable way to provide backflow prevention is to provide an air gap. An air gap is simply an open vertical space between any device that connects to a plumbing system (like a valve or faucet) and any place where contaminated water can collect or pool. A simple air gap has no moving parts, other than flowing water. Many plumbing codes specify a minimum air gap distance required for various circumstances, such as a drain connection for a dishwasher, e.g., BS 6282.

Alternatively, a specialized backflow preventer valve may be installed at strategic locations in the plumbing system wherever there is a risk of contaminated fluids entering the water supply pipes. These valves are used where there is not sufficient vertical clearance or physical space to install an air gap, or when pressurized operation or other factors rule out use of an air gap. Because these valves use moving parts, they are often required to be inspected or tested periodically.

== Regulatory requirements ==
To prevent contamination due to back pressure, many health regulatory regimes require an air gap or mechanical backflow prevention assembly between the delivery point of mains water and local storage or use. Where submerged mains inflow is permitted, a backflow prevention assembly is required, which protects the potable water system from contamination hazards. A check valve is a basic form of backflow prevention, but often more complex devices are required because check valves are not considered to be reliable, when compared to more sophisticated devices with redundancies and reduced-pressure zones.

In many countries. approved backflow prevention assemblies are required by law, and must be installed in accordance with plumbing or building codes. A typical backflow assembly has test cocks and shut-off valves, and must be tested when installed, if relocated or repaired, and also on a periodic basis.

In the US, the Environmental Protection Agency (EPA) holds local water suppliers responsible for maintaining a certain amount of purity in potable water systems. Many states and/or local municipalities require annual testing of backflow prevention assemblies. In most cases, the law requires a double check (DC), reduced pressure principle device (RP) device, or an air gap when backflow prevention is mandated.

== Partial list of backflow prevention devices and assemblies ==
- Air gap (AG the purest form of backflow prevention)
- Atmospheric vacuum breaker (AVB)
- Check valve (usually not a legally approved method of backflow prevention.)
- Chemigation valve (primarily used in agriculture)
- Double check valve assembly (DCVA)
- Dual check valve (A dual check is not a testable device and is mainly used on residential customers)
- Pressure vacuum breaker assembly (PVB)
- Reduced pressure zone device (RPZ)
- Spill resistant pressure vacuum breaker assembly (SPVB)
- Vacuum breaker

== See also ==
- Backflow (plumbing)
- Overflow relief gully
