= Double check valve =

Backflow prevention device to protect water supply from contaminants

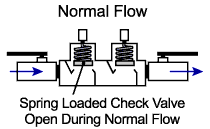
Double check valve during normal operation

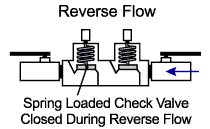
Double check valve during reverse flow

A double check valve or double check assembly (DCA) is a backflow prevention device designed to protect water supplies from contamination. It is different from the two-way check valves (sometimes erroneously referred to as double check valves) used in air brake systems on heavy trucks which select from the highest pressure source.

It consists of two check valves assembled in series and uses two operating principles. One check valve still acts even if the other is jammed wide open. Also, the closure of one valve reduces the pressure differential across the other, which allows a more reliable seal and avoiding even minor leakage.

Small valves may be so compact as to be barely noticeable particularly when they are integrated into the bodies of existing taps (faucets). Larger check valves may be installed with ball valves at their ends for isolation and testing. Often, test cocks (very small ball valves) are in place to attach test equipment for evaluating whether the double check assembly is still functional.

The double check valve assembly is suitable for prevention of back pressure and back siphonage but is not suitable for high hazard applications. It is commonly used on lawn irrigation, fire sprinkler and combi-boiler systems. If the hazard is higher or even a relatively low hazard, such as using antifreeze in the fire sprinkler system, a more reliable check valve such as a reduced pressure zone device may be mandated.

== Dual check valve ==
A dual check backflow preventer is similar to a double check valve in operation. It has two independent spring-loaded check valves. Due to their low cost, dual check valves are often used by water utilities immediately after the water meter as a form of secondary backflow protection. However, dual check valves usually do not include shutoff valves; may or may not be equipped with test cocks or ports; and are generally less reliable than double check valves, which limits usage to low hazard applications.

== See also ==
- Air gap
- Hydrostatic loop
- Pressure vacuum breaker
- Chemigation valve
- Reduced pressure principle BFP
- Atmospheric vacuum breaker
- Reduced pressure zone device
- Air brake (road vehicle)
