= Overflow relief gully =

Sewage overflow prevention fitting

An overflow relief gully beside an external brick wall.

An overflow relief gully (ORG), also known as a yard gully or a yard sink, is a plumbing fitting used in Australian sewerage systems to prevent sewage from overflowing inside buildings. As a grated drain, it acts as a relief valve in the event of a sewer blockage. It is usually located outside a house near the kitchen, bathroom or laundry, where it provides an outlet for wastewater during sewer blockages or backups.

== Design and function ==
Overflow relief gullies (ORG) are drain-like fittings that normally consist of a vertical pipe with a removable grate. They are generally between 100 and 150 millimetres (3.9 and 5.9 in) in diameter and are made of plastic or metal alloy. During a sewer blockage, wastewater rises through the gully, dislodging the grate and overflowing outside rather than through internal plumbing fixtures. An ORG is designed to act as a pressure relief outlet when a sewer becomes blocked or overwhelmed by rainwater during storms. In these events, its grate is designed to lift, relieving pressure, allowing sewage to overflow outside the building rather than back up into the home. The grate of an ORG must remain unobstructed so that it can lift during a sewer backup. ORGs may vary in appearance between properties and should not be mistaken for stormwater drains.

=== Installation requirements ===
Under Australian plumbing standards, the gully's overflow level is generally required to be at least 150 millimetres (5.9 in) below the lowest connected internal fixture and 75 millimetres (3.0 in) above the surrounding ground level. These clearances help prevent internal sewage overflows and stormwater entering the sewerage system. The ORGs must be installed at least 150 millimetres (5.9 in) below the lowest internal plumbing fixture and 75 millimetres (3.0 in) above ground level to block stormwater entering the sewerage system. Majority of properties constructed after 1976 have ORGs surrounded by concrete near an external wall. Older buildings may lack ORGs, unless subsequent plumbing work included its installation. Moreover, ORG designs have varied over time, with each meeting the standards in place when installed.

== Maintenance and stormwater intrusion ==
Covering the gully with landscaping, concrete or other objects can prevent it from functioning correctly. On some properties, particularly those in low-lying areas or where the ORG is installed too low, the fitting may become submerged during heavy rainfall or flooding, allowing stormwater to enter the sewerage system. Stormwater may unintentionally enter an overflow relief gully when landscaping or other obstructions prevent proper drainage. As water accumulates around the gully, it may rise above the opening and flow into the wastewater network. In Queensland, discharging stormwater into the sewerage system, whether through an ORG, downpipes or drainage pipes, is prohibited and may result in fines imposed by the local council. ORGs should be unimpeded, properly maintained and surrounded by a clear drainage path to reduce the risk of property damage and health hazards.

== See also ==
- Sanitary sewer
- Backflow prevention device
- Sanitary sewer overflow
