= Pressure vacuum breaker =

Backflow prevention device

A pressure vacuum breaker (PVB) is a type of backflow prevention device, used to keep non-potable (or contaminated) water from entering the water supply. A PVB is similar to an atmospheric vacuum breaker (AVB), except that the PVB contains a spring-loaded poppet. This makes it acceptable for applications that are high hazard or where valves are downstream. Pressure vacuum breakers must be protected from freezing when installed outdoors. PVBs usually have test cocks, to which specially-calibrated gauges are attached, in order to ensure that they are functioning properly.

Backflow prevention devices such as PVBs are regulated by the Uniform Plumbing Code, but may also be required by government regulations.

== See also ==
- Air gap
- Atmospheric vacuum breaker
- Chemigation valve
- Double check valve
- Hydrostatic loop
- Reduced Pressure Principle BFP
