= Upstream contamination =

Contaminants moving opposite of flow

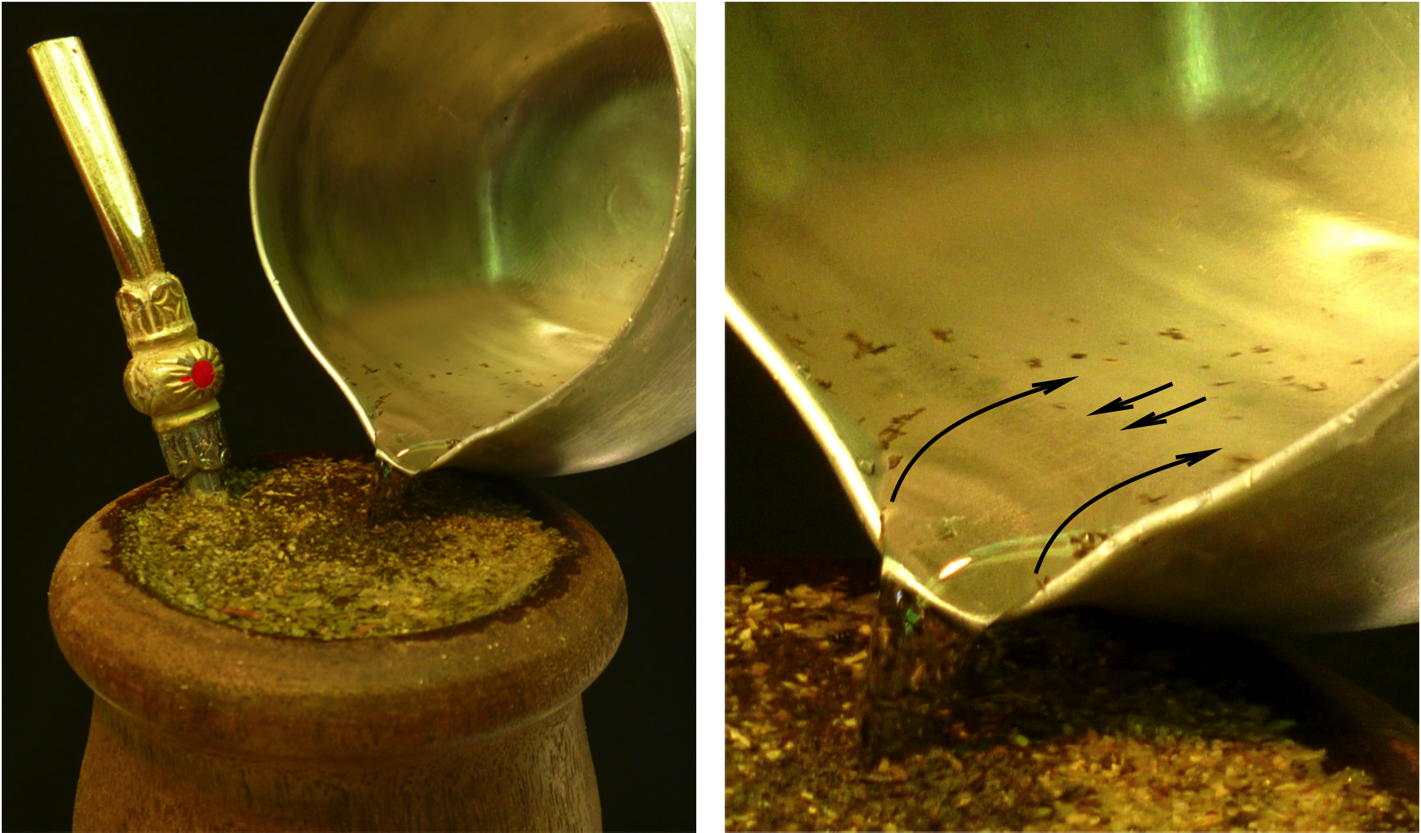
Particles can climb up the falling water while preparing a mate beverage.

Upstream contamination by floating particles is a counterintuitive phenomenon in fluid dynamics. When pouring water from a higher container to a lower one, particles floating in the latter can climb upstream into the upper container. A definitive explanation is still lacking: experimental and computational evidence indicates that the contamination is chiefly driven by surface tension gradients, however the phenomenon is also affected by the dynamics of swirling flows that remain to be fully investigated.

== History ==
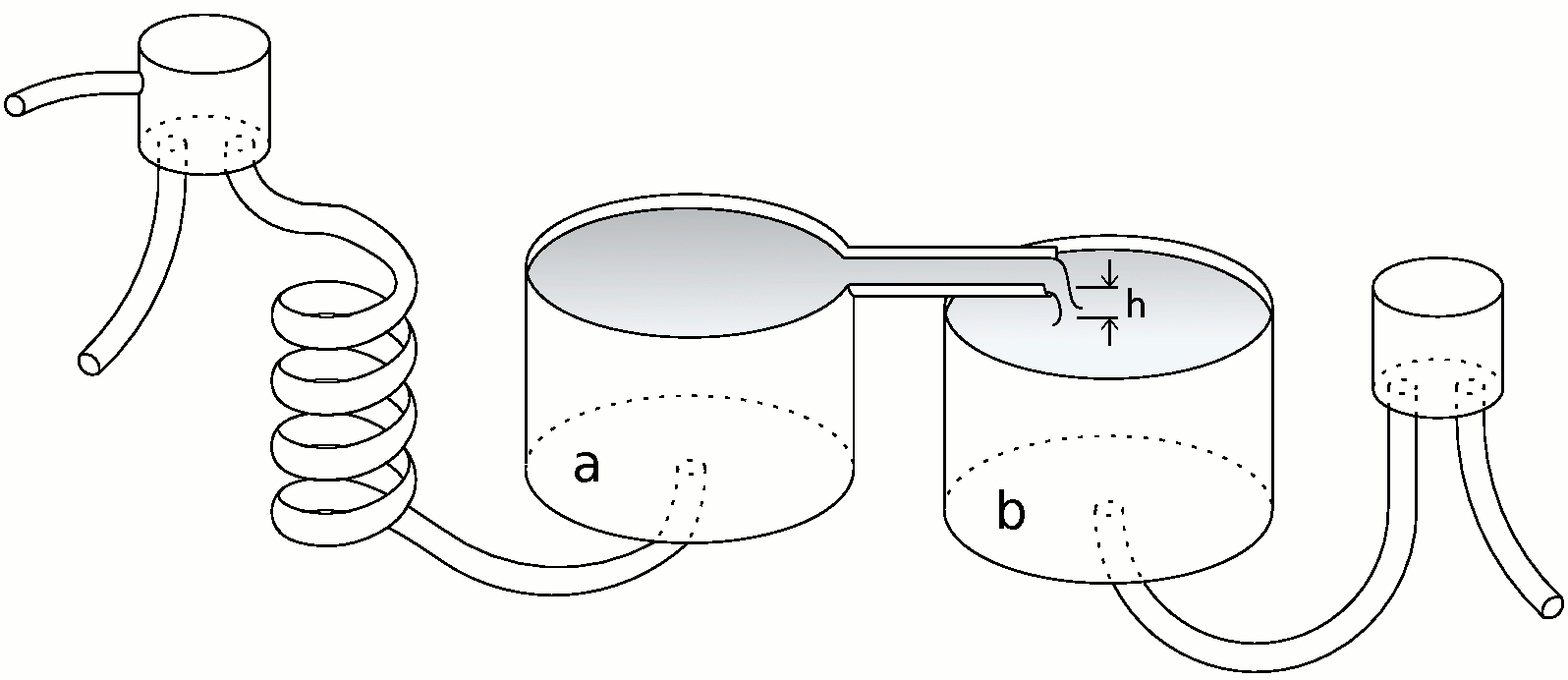
Experimental setup for creating a constant flow of water falling from a higher to a lower recipient.

The upstream flow phenomenon was observed in 2008 by the Argentine Sebastian Bianchini during mate tea preparation, while studying physics at the University of Havana. It rapidly attracted the interest of professor Alejandro Lage-Castellanos, who performed, with Bianchini, a series of controlled experiments. Later on professor Ernesto Altshuler completed the trio in Havana, which resulted in the Diploma thesis of Bianchini and a short original paper posted in the web arXiv and mentioned as a surprising fact in some online journals.

Bianchini's Diploma thesis showed that the phenomenon could be reproduced in a controlled laboratory setting using mate leaves or chalk powder as contaminants, and that temperature gradients (hot in the top, cold in the bottom) were not necessary to generate the effect. The research also showed that surface tension was key to the explanation through the Marangoni effect. This was suggested by two facts: (a) both mate and chalk lowered the surface tension of water, and (b) if an industrial surfactant was added on the upper reservoir, the upstream motion of particles would stop.

In 2024, a research paper published in PLOS One showed, under certain conditions, the phenomenon was found to occur even without the presence of the Marangoni Effect. Particles moved upstream even when the surface tension of the lower fluid container was increased by the addition of calcium chloride. It also showed that the number of particles were maximum at 45 degree inclination, while vertical and horizontal inclination gave better results. And a somewhat Karman-like vortex street was also found in the experiment.

== Confirmation ==
After a talk by Lage-Castellanos at the First Workshop on Complex Matter Physics in Havana (MarchCOMeeting'2012), professor Troy Shinbrot of Rutgers University became interested in the subject. Together with student Theo Siu, Cuban results were confirmed and expanded with new experiments and numerical simulations at Rutgers, which resulted in a joint peer-reviewed paper.

== See also ==
- List of unsolved problems in physics
