= EDR =

EDR may refer to:

== Organisations ==
- Ems Dollart Region, an INTERREG-IV organisation on the Dutch-German border
- Experimenterende Danske Radioamatører, a Danish amateur radio organization

== Science and technology ==
- Electrodermal response of electrical characteristics of skin
- Electrodialysis reversal desalination process
- Endpoint detection and response for detecting cyber threats
- Enhanced Data Rate
  - Bluetooth Enhanced Data Rate
- Equivalence of direct radiation of radiators
- European Drawer Rack, on the International Space Station
- Event data recorder in some automobiles

== Transportation ==
- Edmonton Green railway station (station code), London, England
- Edward River Airport (IATA code), Queensland, Australia
- Emergency Detour Route, originally Emergency Diversion Routes, Ontario, Canada
- Fly All Ways (ICAO airline designator), a Surinamese airline

== Other uses ==
- Eastern Development Region, Nepal, one of the five development regions of Nepal
- Election day registration, in the US
- European depositary receipt, represents ownership in the shares of a non-European company that trades in European financial markets
- Economic Demonstrated Resources, Australian index for resources for which profitable extraction or production is possible
