= Franklin stove =

Type of fireplace

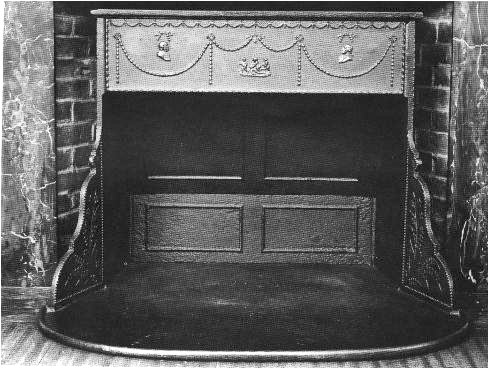
A Franklin stove

The Franklin stove is a metal-lined fireplace named after Benjamin Franklin, who invented it in 1742. It had a hollow baffle near the rear (to transfer more heat from the fire to a room's air) and relied on an "inverted siphon" to draw the fire's hot fumes around the baffle. Also known as a "circulating stove" or the "Pennsylvania fireplace", it was intended to save firewood and produce more heat and less smoke than an ordinary open fireplace. Over the course of 45 years, Franklin would produce five different designs of stoves, with the last ones burning coal rather than wood.

== History ==
The two distinguishing features of Franklin's stove were a hollow baffle (a metal panel that directed the flow of the fire's fumes) and a flue that acted as an upside-down siphon.

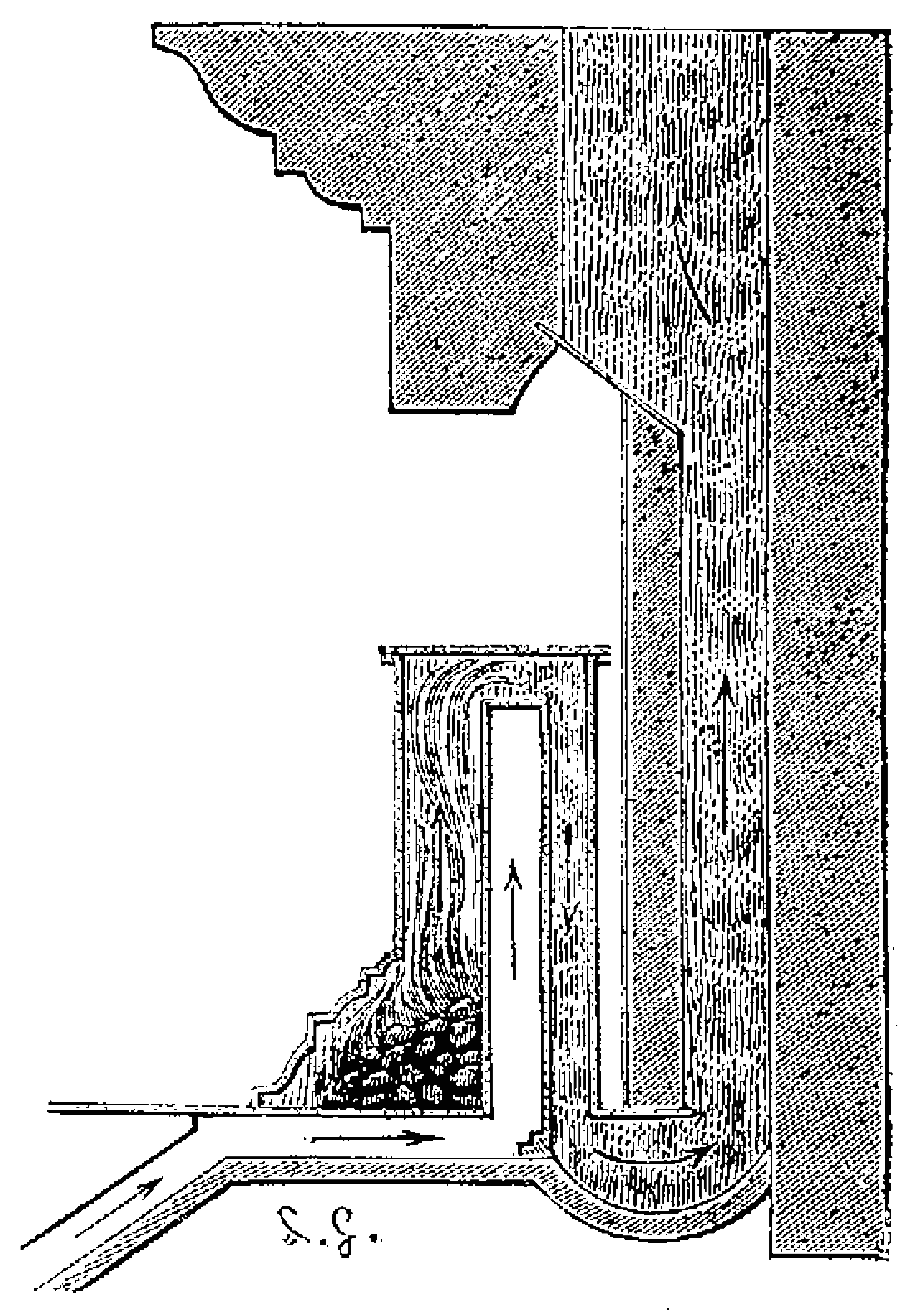
Cross section of the Franklin stove. Cool room air enters the baffle through a duct under the floor on the left. It is heated, rises and leaves through an opening (not shown). Smoke and heat from the fire is drawn around the baffle and exits through a U-shaped duct to the flue.

=== Baffles in fireplaces ===
Baffles were used to lengthen the path that either a room's air or a fire's fumes had to flow through ductwork, thereby allowing more heat to be transferred to the room's air temperatures or from the fire's fumes. Specifically, ducts could be installed within the brickwork around a hearth; cool room air would then enter the lower end of a duct, be heated by the hot walls of the duct, rise, and finally exit from the duct's upper end, and return to the room. The longer the path through which the air flowed, the more heat would be transferred from the fire to the air. Similarly, the longer the duct through which a fire's fumes had to flow before reaching the chimney, the more heat would be transferred from the fumes to the room's air.

The use of baffles to extract more heat from a fire and its fumes was not new. In 1618, Franz Kessler (c. 1580–1650) of Frankfurt-am-Main, Germany published Holzsparkunst (The Art of Saving Wood), featuring a stove in which the fumes from a fire were forced to snake through five chambers, one above the other, before entering the chimney. Kessler also documented an enclosed heating stove that, like Franklin's stove, had a baffle directly behind the fire, thereby lengthening the path that the fire's fumes had to travel before reaching the chimney.

In 1624, a French physician, Louis Savot (1579–1640), described a fireplace that he had built in the Louvre. Ducts passed under, behind, and above the fire in the hearth. Cool air in the room entered the lower opening of a duct, was warmed, rose, and returned to the room through the duct's upper opening. In 1713, Frenchman Nicolas Gauger (c. 1680–1730) published a book, La Mécanique du Feu (The Mechanics of Fire), in which he presented novel designs for fireplaces. Gauger surrounded the hearth with hollow spaces. Inside these spaces were baffles. Cool room air entered the spaces through lower openings, was warmed as it snaked around the baffles in the spaces, and returned to the room through upper openings.

In Franklin's stove, a hollow baffle was positioned inside and near the rear of the stove. The baffle was a wide but thin cast-iron box, which was open to the room's air at its bottom and two holes on its sides, near its top. Air entered the bottom of the box and was heated both by the fire and by the fumes flowing over the front and back of the box. The warmed air then rose inside the baffle and exited through the holes in the baffle's sides. Franklin's baffle thus performed at least two functions: like Kessler's heating stove, it lengthened the path that the fire's fumes had to follow before reaching the chimney, allowing more heat to be extracted from the fumes; and like Gauger's fireplace, it placed a duct near the fire, which heated the room's air via convection.

=== Inverted siphons in fireplaces ===
Some early experimenters reasoned that if a fire in a fireplace were connected by a U-shaped duct to the chimney, the hot gases ascending through the chimney would draw the fire's smoke and fumes first downwards through one leg of the U and then upwards through the other leg and the chimney. This was what Franklin called an "aerial syphon" or "syphon revers'd". This inverted siphon was used to draw the fire's hot fumes up the front and down the back of the Franklin stove's hollow baffle, in order to extract as much heat as possible from the fumes.

The earliest known example of such an inverted siphon was the 1618 fireplace of Franz Kessler. The fire burned in a ceramic box. Inside the box and behind the fire was a baffle. The baffle forced the fire's fumes to descend behind the baffle before exiting to the chimney. The intention was to extract as much heat as possible from the fumes by extending the path that the fumes had to follow before they reached the chimney.

The 1678 fireplace of Prince Rupert (1619–1682) also included an inverted siphon. Rupert placed a hanging iron door between the fire grate and the chimney. In order to exit through the chimney, the fire's fumes and smoke first had to descend below the edge of the door before rising through the chimney.

Another early example of an inverted siphon was a stove that was exhibited in 1686 at the annual Foire Saint-Germain, Paris. Its inventor, André Dalesme (1643–1727), called it a smokeless stove (furnus acapnos). The stove consisted of an iron bowl in which the fuel was burned. A pipe extended from the bowl's bottom and then upwards into a chimney. Shortly after starting a fire in the bowl, hot air would begin to rise through the pipe and then up the chimney; this created a downward draft through the bowl, which drew the fire and its fumes down into the bowl. Once the draft was initiated, it was self-sustaining as long as the fire burned. Dalesme's stove could burn wood, incense, and even "coal steept in cats-piss" yet produce very little smoke or smell. These results showed that fires could be used inside a room, without filling the house with smoke.

Franklin's stove contained a baffle directly behind the fire, which forced the fire's fumes to flow downward before they reached the chimney. This required a U-shaped duct in the floor behind the stove, so that the fumes could flow from the stove into the chimney. Thus Franklin's stove incorporated an inverted siphon.

=== Franklin's research and development ===
Gauger's book on his innovative fireplace designs was translated into English – Fires Improv'd: Being a New Method of Building Chimneys, So as to Prevent their Smoaking (1715) – by a French immigrant to England, Jean Théophile Desaguliers (1683–1744). In a postscript to Desaguliers' book A Course in Experimental Philosophy (1744), Desaguliers again briefly described Gauger's fireplaces and mentioned his own work on the subject. Franklin read both of Desaguliers' books and developed his own designs for a stove that could provide more heat with less smoke.

In 1742, Franklin finished his first design which implemented new scientific concepts about heat which had been developed by the Dutch physician Herman Boerhaave (1668–1738), a proponent of Isaac Newton's ideas. He supplied his equipment from a local iron pioneer William Branson from Reading, Pennsylvania. Franklin wanted his stoves to be available to everyone, relishing popular appreciation of his handiwork and eschewing patents. This combination of events led to the first Franklin stoves being manufactured by Reading furnaces, which was owned by the local Van Leer family. Two years later, Franklin wrote a pamphlet describing his design and how it operated in order to sell his product. Around this time, the deputy governor of Pennsylvania, George Thomas, made an offer to Franklin to patent his design, but Franklin never patented any of his designs and inventions. He believed "that as we enjoy great advantages from the inventions of others, we should be glad of an opportunity to serve others by any invention of ours, and this we should do freely and generously". As a result, many others were able to use Franklin's design and improve it. Although his stove was intended to have the double purpose of cooking and heating a room, as time progressed and new stove designs became available, the Franklin stove's main use became to heat a room. Many others improved on the Franklin stove design, but to this day, most American fireplaces are box-shaped, similar to the Franklin stove. The exception is the Rumford fireplace, developed by Benjamin Thompson.

== Stove design ==
The stove was about 30 inches (76 cm) tall, with a box shape. The front was open, except for a decorative panel in the upper part of the box. The back of the box was to be placed a few inches away from the flue (chimney). On the bottom panel there were several holes to allow the smoke to escape; these were connected to the chimney. The panels were bolted together with iron screws through pre-cast ears. Inside there was a small, thin rectangular prism that would force the smoke into the holes. The plates were all made from iron.

Franklin's stove sold poorly. The problem lay with the inverted siphon: the smoke had to pass through a cold flue (which was set in the floor) before the smoke could enter the chimney; consequently, the smoke cooled too much and the stove did not have a good draft. The inverted siphon would operate properly only if the fire burned constantly, so that the temperature in the flue was high enough to produce a draft.

A later version, designed by David Rittenhouse, solved many of the problems Franklin's original stove had, and became popular. Franklin's fame outweighed Rittenhouse's, though, so history remembers the Franklin Stove rather than the Rittenhouse Stove. The smaller Latrobe stove, often referred to as a Baltimore Heater, was patented in 1846 and became popular.

== See also ==
- Air-tight stove
- Angithi
- Bukhari (heater), traditional Indian wood stove
- Hearth
- Masonry heater
- Potbelly stove
- Rocket mass heater
- Rumford fireplace
- Space heater
- Wood-burning stove
