= Heat exchange =

Heat exchange may refer to:

- Heat transfer, an area of engineering concerned with the transfer of thermal energy (heat)
- Heat exchanger, a device built for heat transfer from one medium to another
  - Air conditioner, a device that cools interior air, such as that of a building or vehicle
  - Heat sink, a device used to absorb energy, typically by using its large mass to raise its temperature slightly or by changing phase
  - Radiator, a device used to either move heat away from an object or heat an interior space by circulating a fluid through thin metal tubes
  - Refrigerator, a device used to cool objects or interior spaces
  - Space heater, a device used to heat spaces, typically interior spaces
