= Convector =

Convector may refer to:

- Convector (mythology), a Roman god
- Convector heater, a type of heating and cooling element
- Convection oven, a type of oven
