= Radiator (heating) =

Heat exchanger for space heating

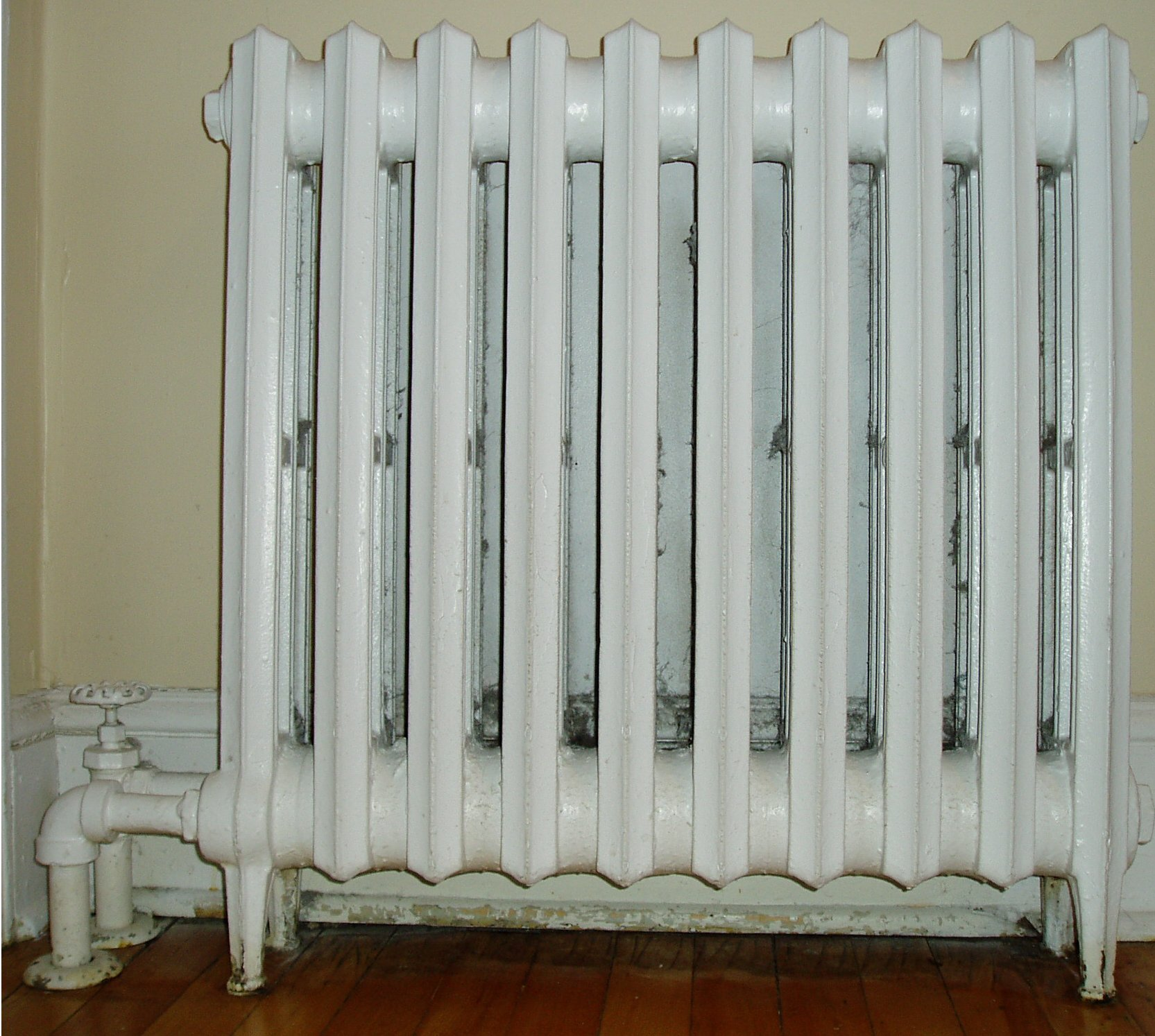
A cast iron household radiator

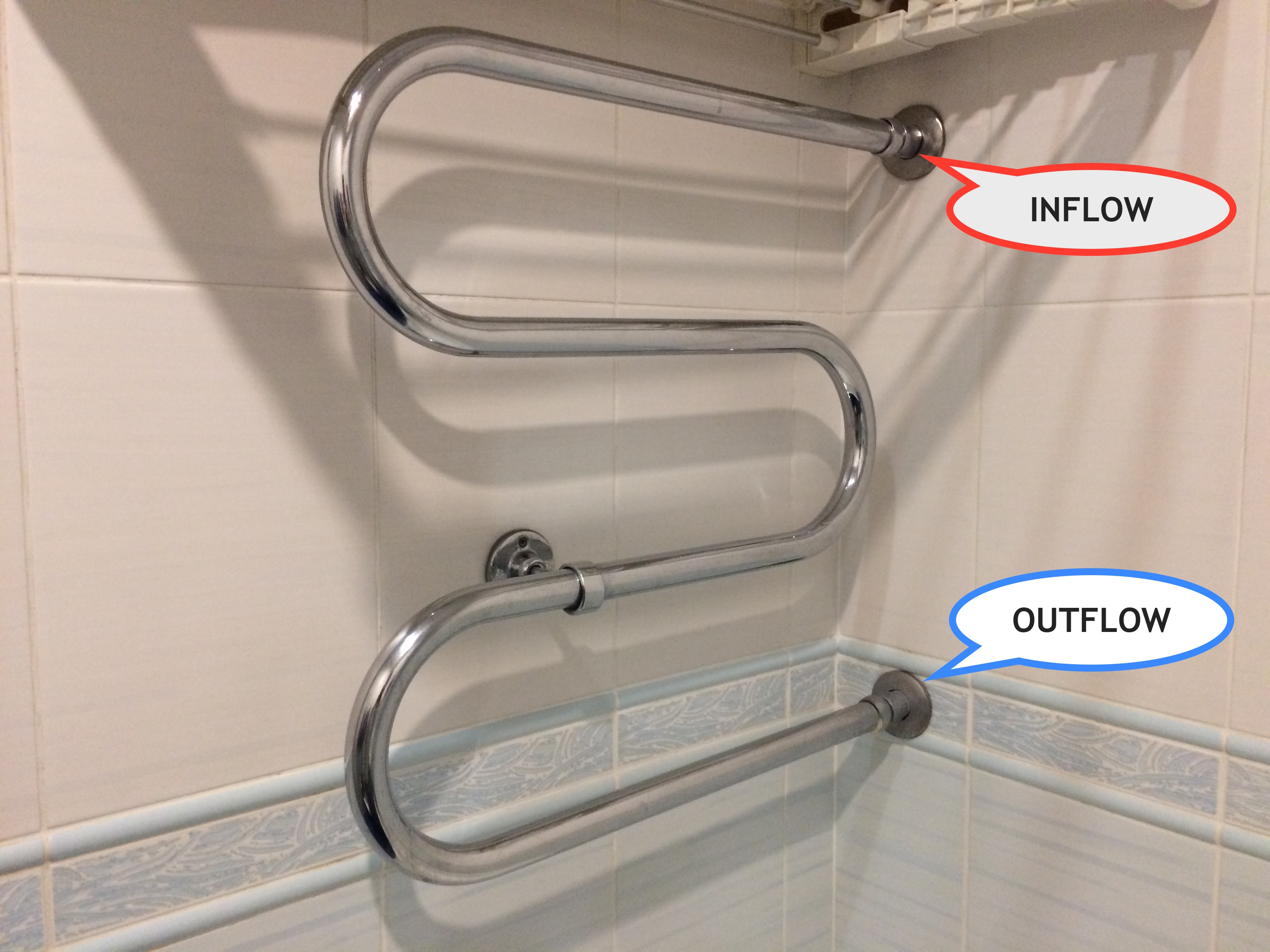
Heat exchange by built-in bathroom radiator uses hot water flow through the stainless steel pipes seen here to raise the temperature of the ambient air. The radiator depicted here also serves as a towel rack and warmer.

Radiators and convectors are heat exchangers designed to transfer thermal energy from one medium to another for the purpose of space heating.

Denison Olmsted of New Haven, Connecticut, appears to have been the earliest person to use the term 'radiator' to mean a heating appliance in an 1834 patent for a stove with a heat exchanger which then radiated heat. In the patent he wrote that his invention was "a peculiar kind of apparatus, which I call a radiator". The heating radiator was invented by Franz San Galli in 1855, a Kingdom of Prussia-born Russian businessman living in St. Petersburg. In the late 1800s, companies, such as the American Radiator Company, promoted cast iron radiators over previous fabricated steel designs in order to lower costs and expand the market.

== Radiation vs. convection ==
A radiator is a device that transfers heat to a medium primarily through thermal radiation. In practice, the term radiator is often applied to any number of devices in which a fluid circulates through exposed pipes (often with fins or other means of increasing surface area), notwithstanding that such devices tend to transfer heat mainly by convection and might logically be called convectors.

The terms convection heater and convector refer to a class of devices in which the source of heat is not directly exposed.

== Energy source ==
=== Steam ===
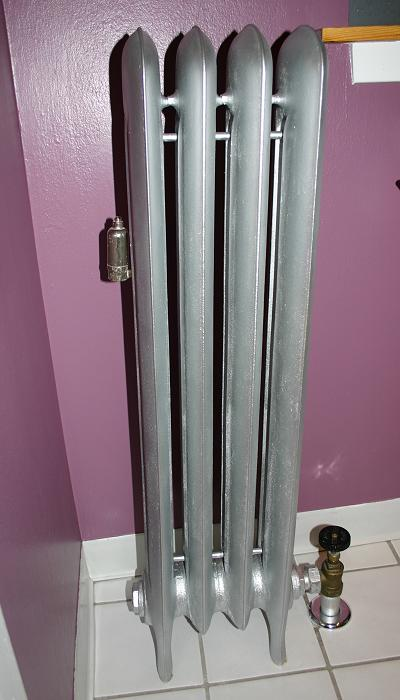
A cast iron radiator with single-pipe steam supply and radiator air vent

Steam has the advantage of flowing through pipes under its own pressure without the need for pumping. For this reason, it was adopted earlier, before electric motors and pumps became available. Steam is also far easier to distribute than hot water throughout large, tall buildings like skyscrapers. However, the higher temperatures at which steam systems operate make them inherently less efficient, as unwanted heat loss is inevitably greater.

Steam pipes and radiators are prone to producing banging sounds called steam hammer. The bang is created when some of the steam condenses into water in a horizontal section of the steam piping. Subsequently, steam picks up the water, forms a "slug" and hurls it at high velocity into a pipe fitting, creating a loud hammering noise and greatly stressing the pipe. This condition is usually caused by a poor condensate drainage strategy and is often caused by buildings settling and the resultant pooling of condensate in pipes and radiators that no longer tilt slightly back towards the boiler.

=== Hot water ===
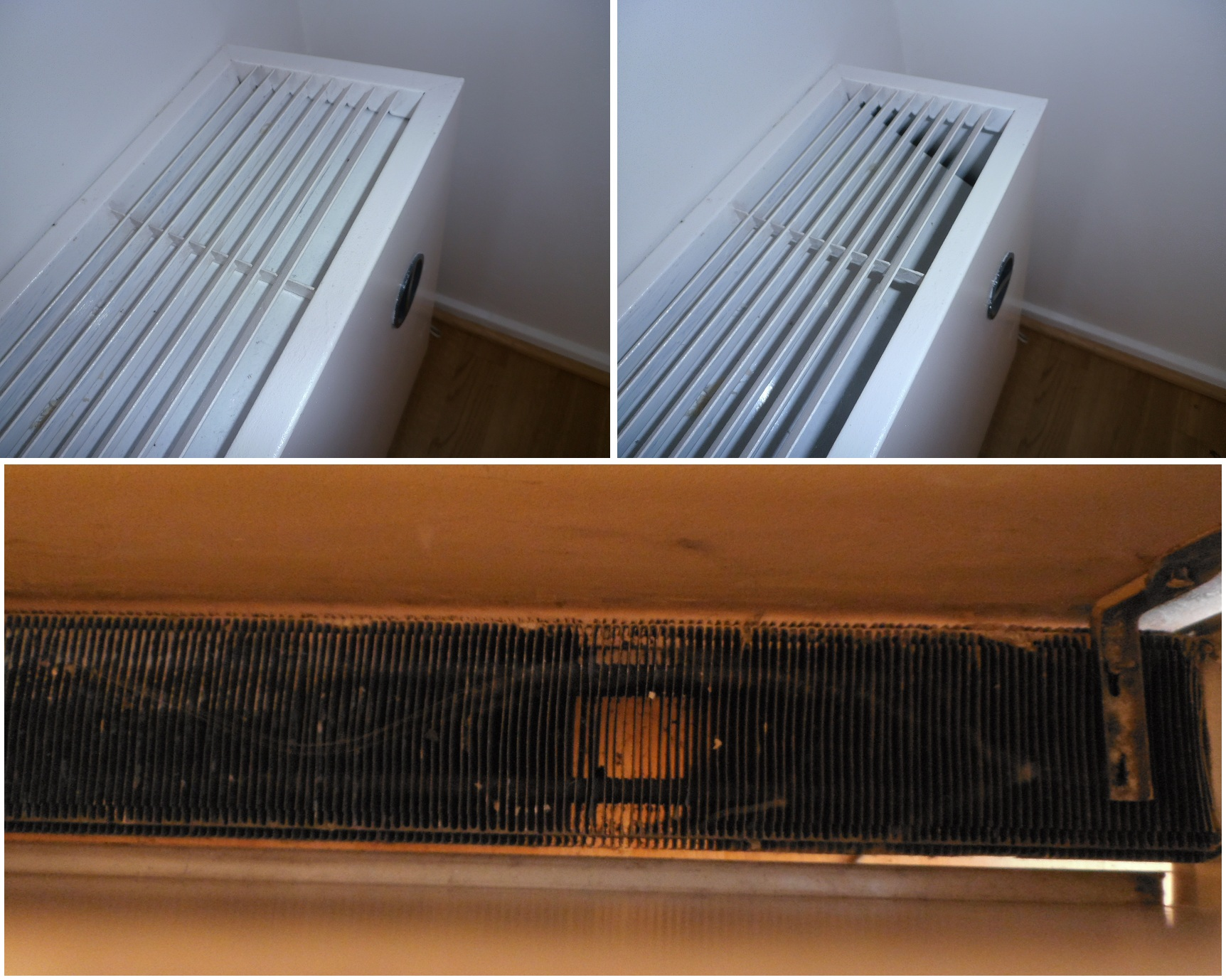
Hot-water baseboard-style radiator (top) which is covered (left) and opened (right), with inside view (bottom) showing the aluminium fins which are attached in series to the copper pipe

A hot-water radiator consists of a sealed hollow metal container filled with hot water from a boiler or other heating device by gravity feed, a pump, or natural convection. As it gives out heat, the hot water cools and sinks to the bottom of the radiator and is forced out of a pipe at the other end. Anti-hammer devices are often installed to prevent or minimize knocking in hot water radiator pipes.

=== Electricity ===
Unlike steam or hot water systems which receive heat from a boiler, electric radiators produce heat from electricity at the location of the radiator. This heat may be transferred to a fluid (such as oil) inside the radiator. The oil circulates inside the radiator by convection, which distributes the heat from the heating element to the surface of the radiator. Smaller electric radiators have the advantage of being portable, as they do not need to be connected to pipework. Some electric radiators can also use hot water; this is particularity common for heated towel rails, where the radiator uses hot water when the central heating system is running but switches to electricity when heating the whole building is not required.

== Shape and design ==
=== Cast iron ===
Cast iron radiators may be used with hot water or steam systems. Traditional cast iron radiators are no longer common in new construction, replaced mostly with forced hot water baseboard or panel radiators, but they remain available.

=== Hot-water baseboard ===
Hot-water baseboard convectors (often referred to as "fin-tube radiators") consist of copper pipes which have aluminum fins attached to increase their surface area. Conduction is used to transfer heat from the water circulated in the pipes into the metal radiators or convectors.

Baseboard convectors are designed to heat the air in the room using convection to transfer heat from the radiators to the surrounding air. They do this by drawing cool air in at the bottom, warming the air as it passes over the radiator fins, and discharging the heated air at the top. This sets up convective loops of air movement within a room. If the radiator is blocked either from above or below, this air movement is prevented, and the heater will not work. Baseboard heating systems are sometimes fitted with moveable covers to allow the resident to fine-tune heating by room, much like air registers in a central air system.

=== Panel radiator ===
Panel radiators are welded from flat or corrugated steel panels, and are usually hung from the wall. They are usually used with hot water systems, but electric versions are also available. The panels often have fins attached, increasing the surface area and therefore the rate of heat transfer into the air (power). Several panels may be stacked together to make one radiator, and the resulting radiator is referred to with a two-digit type number. The first digit is the number of panels, and the second is the number of sets of fins, for example a type 21 radiator has two panels with one set of fins in between. Air flow around the radiator and between the panels is by convection only, and must be unrestricted if the radiator is to reach its design performance. The heat output of panel radiators is regulated by controlling the flow of hot water, with either a manual or a thermostatic valve.

=== Aluminium radiators ===
Radiators can also be made from aluminium which is a very good conductor of heat and has better thermal conductivity compared to that of steel. Aluminium radiators tend to have a low water content so this combined with the excellent thermal conductivity qualities of the metal itself make aluminium radiators very responsive to changes in the temperature demand.

=== Fan-assisted heat exchanger ===
A fan-assisted convector contains a heat exchanger fed by hot water from the heating system. A thermostatic switch energises an electric fan which blows air over the heat exchanger to circulate it in a room. Its advantages are small relative size and even distribution of heat. Disadvantages are fan noise and the need for both a source of heat and a separate electrical supply.

=== Underfloor ===
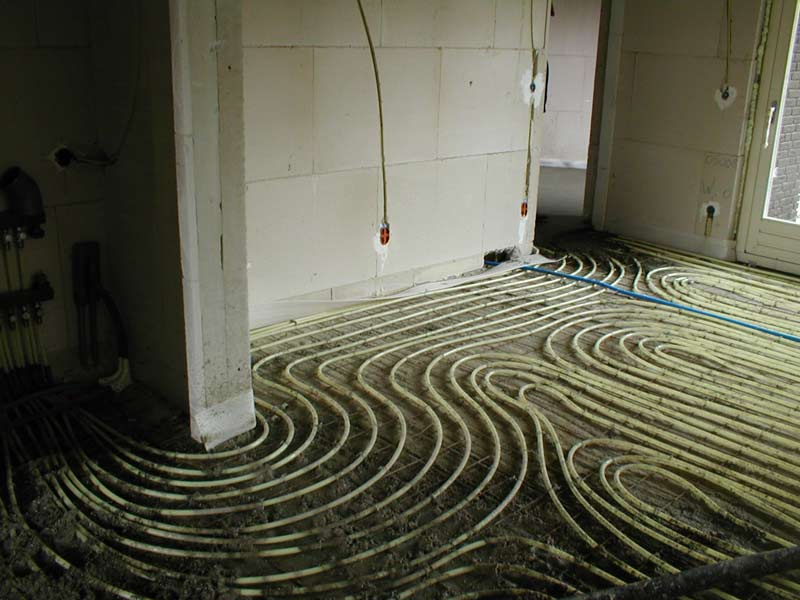
In underfloor heating, tubing is placed on the floor throughout the room and later covered with a concrete layer during construction.

Also known as "radiant heat", underfloor heating uses a network of pipes, tubing or heating cables, buried in or attached beneath a floor to allow heat to rise into the room. Best results are achieved with conductive flooring materials such as tile. The large surface area of such room-sized radiators allows them to be kept just a few degrees above desired room temperature, minimizing convection. Underfloor heating is more expensive in new construction than less efficient systems. It also is generally difficult to retrofit into existing buildings.

The Roman hypocaust employed a similar principle of operation.

=== Skirting-board heating ===
Skirting-board radiators are a form of heater which involves placing radiators inside a skirting board. Hot water is piped though the system, usually taken directly from the central heating system.

== Indoor climate impact ==
Radiators, as any system of heating air that does not add water, reduce relative humidity, possibly contributing to dry skin, reduced comfort, and shrinkage of wood flooring. However, a humidifier can mitigate this issue.

== See also ==
- Heated towel rail
- Space heater
- Bleed screw
- Coolant
- Equivalence of direct radiation
- Heater core
- Hydronics
- Hydronic balancing
- Radiator cabinet
- Radiator reflector
- Radiator (engine cooling)
- Thermostatic radiator valve

== Sources ==
- "Operating information on electric radiators". Laura LNorth01. 2020.
