= Sofono Spacemaster =

The Sofono Spacemaster, and Spacemaster range of domestic electric convector or convector/reflector heaters was produced by the Sofono Electrical Division of Federated Foundries Ltd, Falkirk, Scotland, UK in the mid-20th century. Their distinctive appearance, often referred to as “atomic”, “flying-saucer” or “sputnik”, has ensured their popularity amongst retro style enthusiasts from the late 1990s onwards.

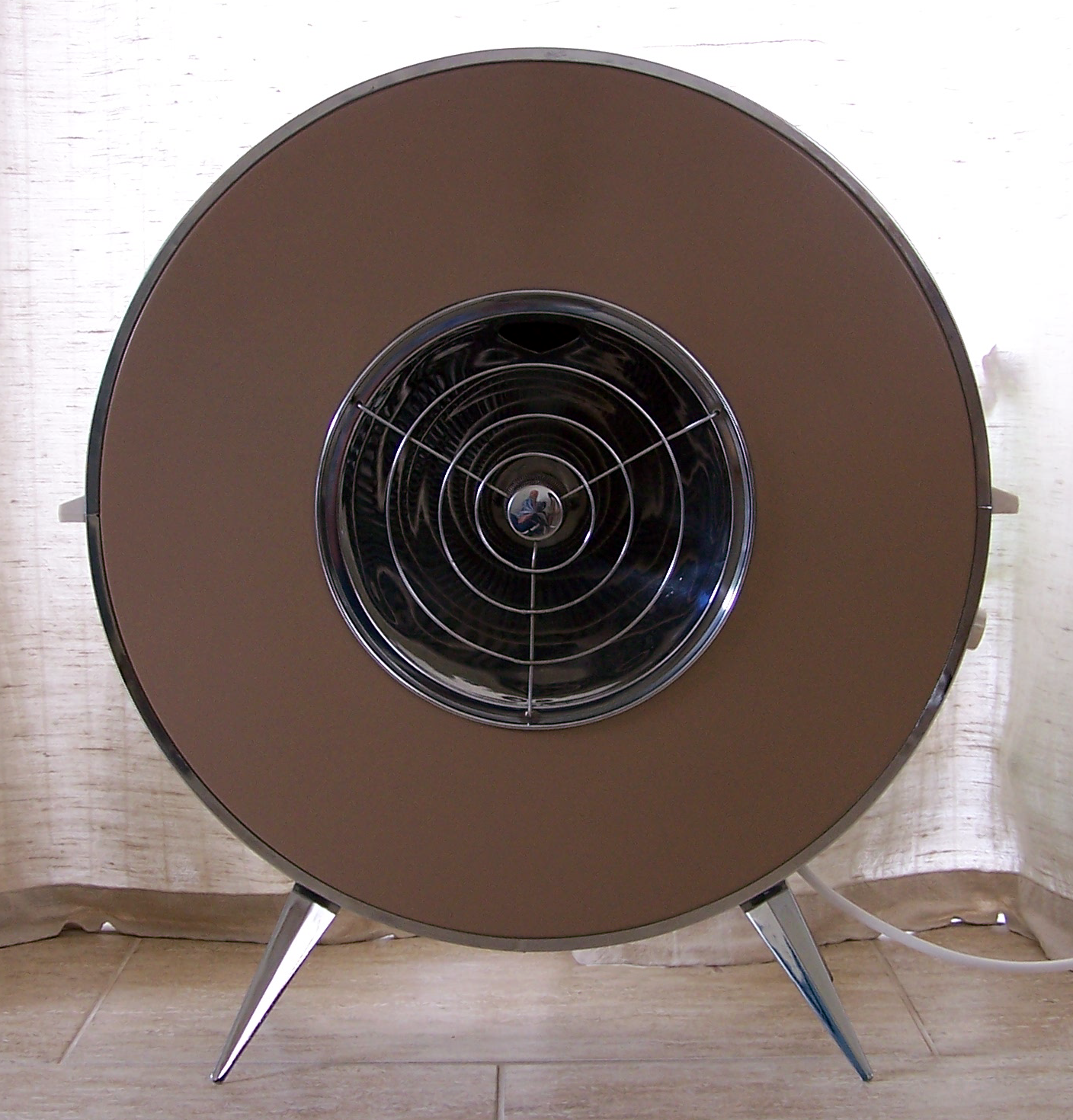
A Sofono Spacemaster (model no PRC402ST) with Mocha paintwork.

== Design ==
The Spacemaster range was designed by Ralph Cameron Ormiston (1921-2000) who is also noted for designing the Carron “Cordon Bleu” cooker, a forerunner of the modern range cooker. The design of the Spacemaster range reflects the contemporary interest in space following the successful launching of Sputnik 1 in 1957. The style falls into the category often referred to as Mid-Century Modern.

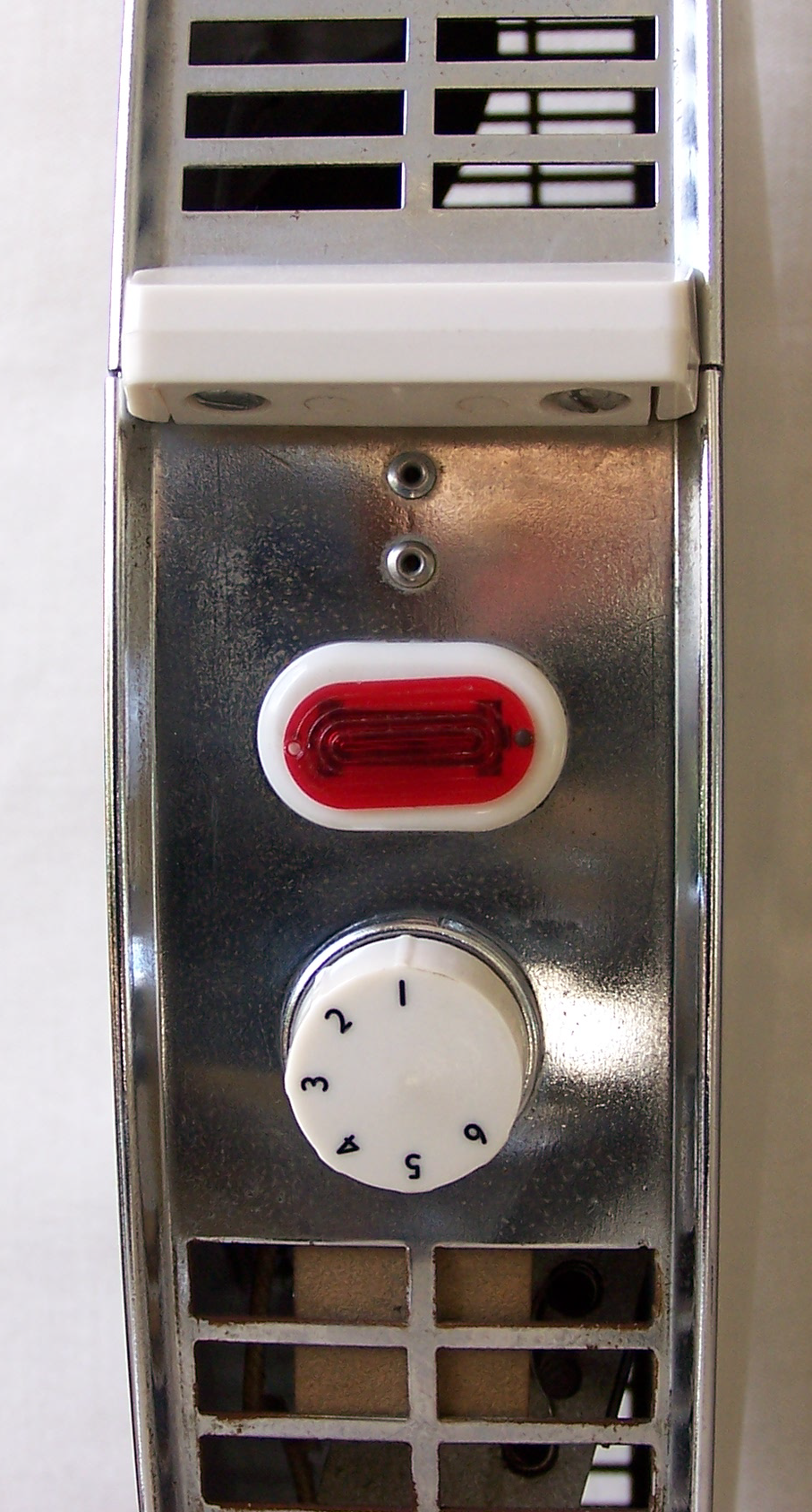
Right-hand panel with pilot light and thermostat control.

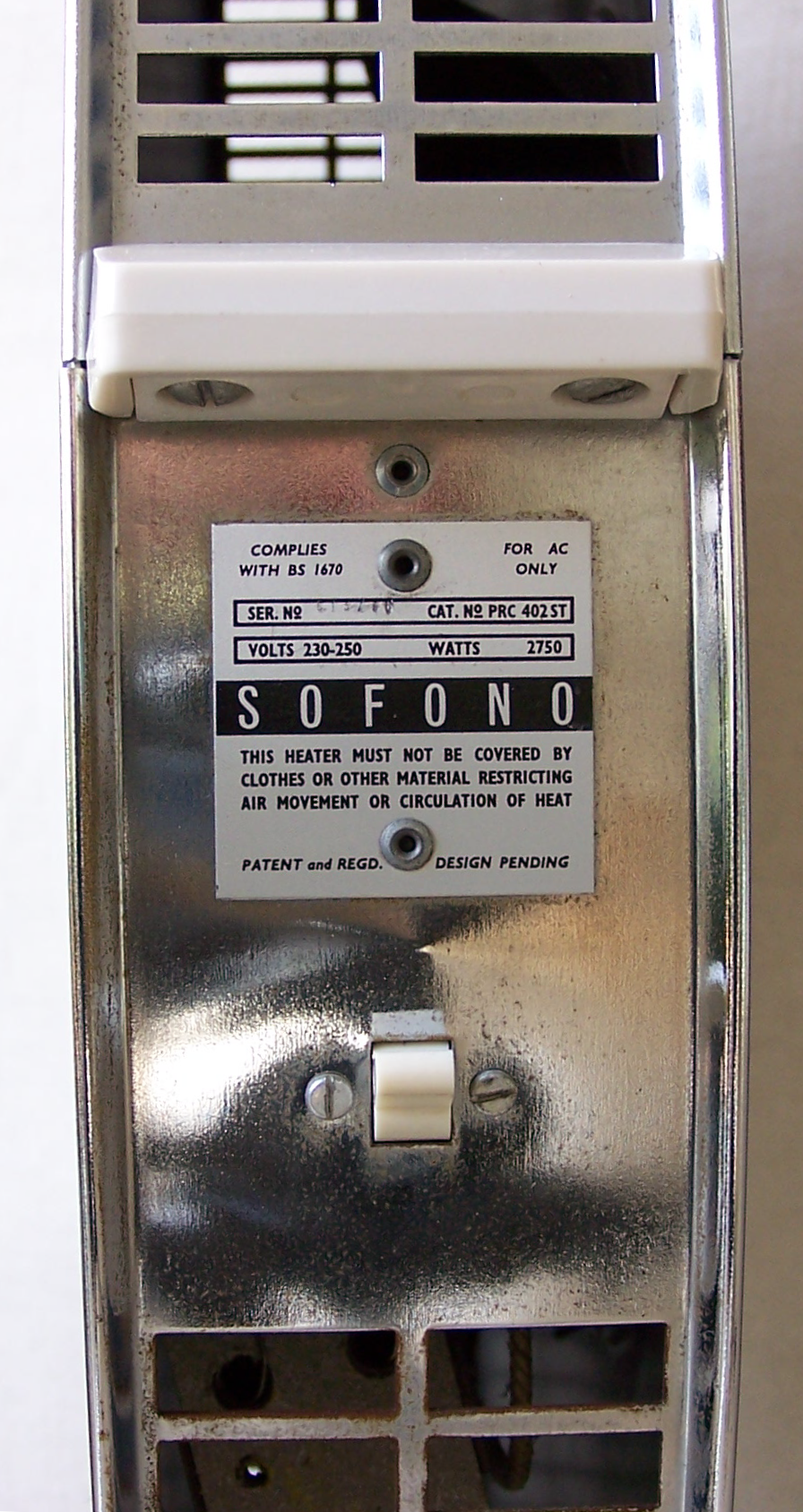
Left-hand panel with on-off control for reflector (radiant) section.

The basic shape of the heaters is a disk with each side an extremely shallow cone. The essential structure consists of two large discs of pressed steel clamped between chrome-plated grilles. This simple and lightweight construction made the units easily portable. The heater is mounted on slim triangular chrome-plated legs, and has white handles to either side made from stay-cool compression-moulded urea-formaldehyde plastic. The internal components can be easily accessed by the removal of the four set-screws underneath the handles, after which the top grille and back panel simply lift off.

Spacemasters were issued initially in a choice of so-called “Home & Garden” colours: Mocha, Flame, Clover Pink, Cloud Grey, and Gunmetal. In 1963, a black version was added to the range. Each unit sported the named colour to the front, and a lighter colour to the back.

All units measured about 69 cm (27 inches) high and about 65 cm (25½ inches) wide. Depth varied depending on the power of the convector heater, being either 11.5 cm (4½ inches) for 1 kilowatt convection units, or 14 cm (5½ inches) for 2 kilowatt.

The only known design variation through the life of the Spacemaster range is to the supports. At some point, the triangular feet were replaced with a simpler rod design.

== Product launch and marketing ==
The Spacemaster range was introduced to the UK market in 1959 and the range was shown at the Building Exhibition, Olympia, London in that same year.

In 1961, the company was telling the trade that their products were:

The electric heaters that dare to be different! Everything is new, fresh, exciting and different about Sofono . . . the range that's fast setting the fashion everywhere. Even one look in your window tells your customers these heaters are way ahead in design and styling. And look at the advertising campaign behind them . . . big, hard-hitting spaces in: Daily Mirror; Daily Express; Daily Telegraph; People; Sunday Express; News of the World; Radio Times; TV Times.

Sales continued until at least 1964, supported by full-page press advertising in publications such as Ideal Home, Good Housekeeping, House Beautiful and the Radio Times and a number of national newspapers.

The Spacemaster PRC402ST was reviewed as part of a radiant-convector electric heater test conducted by the Consumers Association in 1964, and reported on in Which? magazine. At this time, the Spacemaster cost £11-1s-7d, and was one of the cheapest of the heaters tested (the most expensive cost almost four times as much). It was not found to be particularly efficient, and was not amongst the recommended Best Buys. But, as well as being inexpensive, it was electrically safe (by the standards of the day) and very light in weight (at 15lb at least 5lb lighter than any other tested, and less than a third of the weight of the heaviest) making it easy to move around the home.

== Models and features ==
The most commonly surviving Spacemaster model is the PRC402ST combined convector and reflector heater with an overall output of 2.75 kilowatts. The simple convector models are occasionally seen.

In all, seven Spacemaster models are known:

PC101: a 1 kilowatt single-heat convector.
PC101T: a 1 kilowatt thermostatically controlled convector.
PC202S: a 2 kilowatt convector controlled by two switches.
PC202T: a 2 kilowatt thermostatically controlled convector.
PRC301S: a combined 750 watt radiant element and 1 kilowatt convector, controlled by two switches.
PRC301SS: a combined 750 watt radiant element and 1 kilowatt convector, controlled by two switches.
PRC402ST: a combined 750 watt radiant element controlled by a switch, and a 2 kilowatt convector controlled by a thermostat.

== Museum collections ==
Examples of Spacemaster heaters are known from two collections. The Museum of Design in Plastics holds two examples (object nos AIBDC:02497 and AIBDC:001366), while the Betty Smithers Design Collection at Staffordshire University has an incomplete example.
