= Angithi =

Oven and heating device origins northern India

An angithi (Hindustani: अंगीठी or انگیٹھی) is a traditional brazier used for space-heating and cooking in the northern areas of South Asia, mainly in India, Pakistan and Nepal. Angithis usually generate heat from burning coal and, when in use, have glowing coal or charcoal pieces but few or no flames.

== Kanger ==
A smaller, and more decorative, version of the angithi called the kanger or kangri is employed for personal use in Kashmir.

== Hazards ==
Despite public health warnings, angithis are often used in enclosed spaces to maximize heating, resulting in deaths from carbon monoxide poisoning in the region. Public authorities and mass media in the region often exhort people not to use angithis or bukharis in closed rooms.

== See also ==
- Air-tight stove
- Bukhari (heater)
- Franklin stove
- Hibachi - Japanese traditional heater
- Rocket stove
- Wood-burning stove
