= National Radiator Company (United States) =

- Predecessor: Fowler Radiator Company (1894)
- Founded: 1902

The National Radiator Corporation was an American radiator and boiler manufacturer.

== History ==
The National Radiator company developed from the earlier Fowler Radiator Company (est. 1894.) which was acquired in 1896 by John and Samuel Waters; after the acquisition the radiator factory was moved from Norristown to Johnstown. In 1902 the company was renamed National Radiator Company.

== Expansion ==
The company expanded, and by the 1920s had plants in Trenton, New Jersey, Lebanon, Pennsylvania, and New Castle, Pennsylvania. On 8 Aug 1927 the National Radiator Corporation of Delaware was established with a capital of $25 million; the new group incorporated the Union Radiator Company, the Gurney Heater Canufacturing company, the Continental Heater Company, the Niagara Radiator and Boiler Company, and the Utica Heating Company. In 1929 the company established an industrial research laboratory.

== Merger ==
In the early 1930s the company required reorganisation due to debt problems, and was placed into receivership and subsequently re-established. In 1951 a fire at the company's "Century" plant (Moxham) killed one person, and caused $1 million of damage. In 1954 the directors of the company approved a merger with the United States Radiator Corporation.

== See also ==
- Equivalence of direct radiation
