= Towel warmer =

Feature designed to heat towels

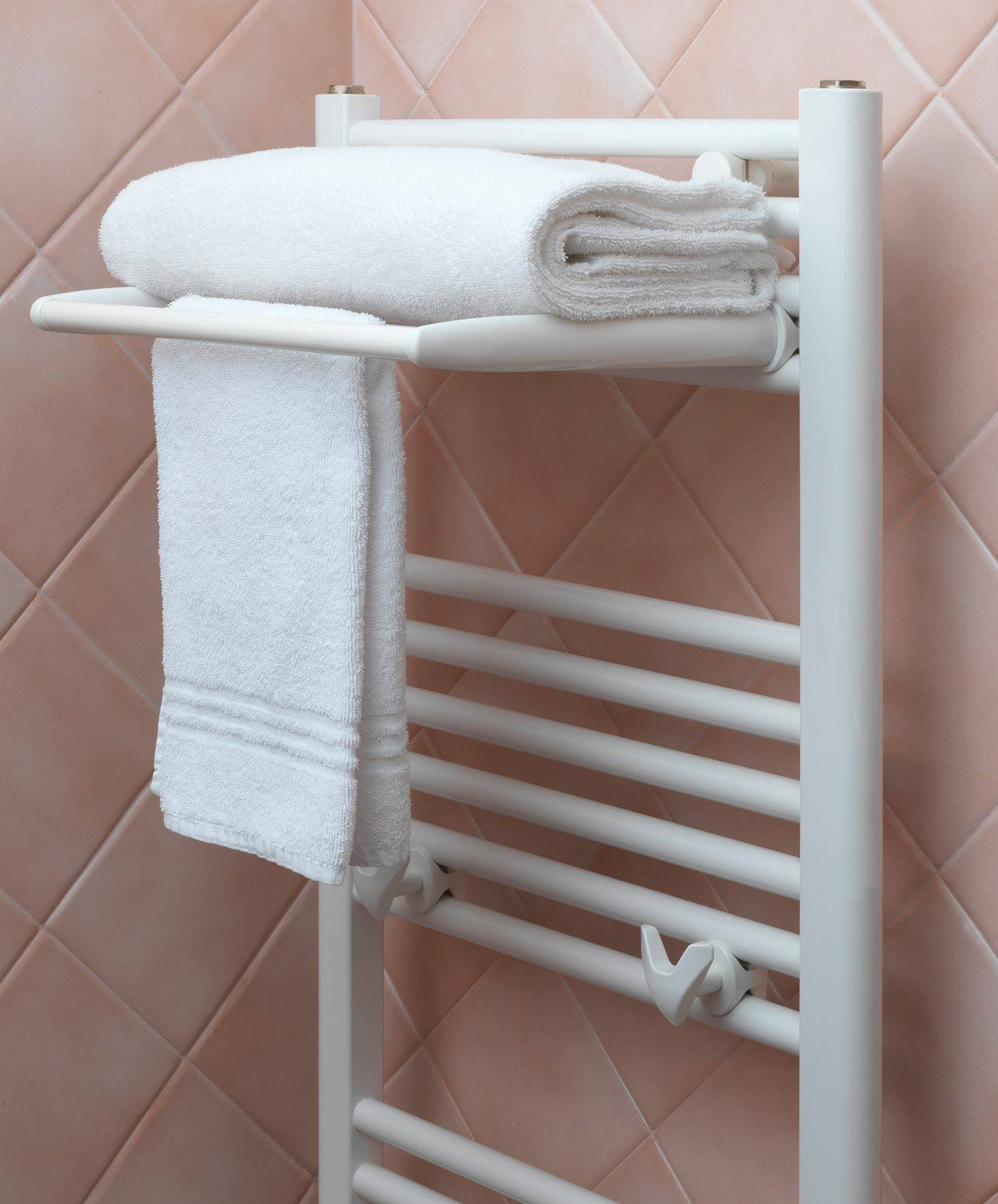
A towel rails radiator with towel hangers

A towel rails radiator or a heated towel rail is a feature designed to heat towels before using them. For many years, European hotels have used them as combined towel- dryers/racks. The towel warmer is a bathroom heater suitable for both drying and heating towels and the environment. There are two versions: traditional ones that are plumbed like a radiator with water heated from a central boiler, and electric ones where an electrical resistance heats water or oil contained in the unit. Towel rails are typically fitted by plumbers.

== Composition and functioning ==
Towel dryers can be made from different metals such as, steel, stainless steel, or aluminum. In some types, brass or copper is used. The finish can be in chrome plating, polished steel, or lacquer.

Dryers can be heated electrically (heating cartridge or heating cable), or by circulating hot water (connected to the central heating). Often, a combination of the methods is used. In these cases, the dryer is heated by hot water in wintertime, and by electricity in the summer. A towel dryer, with high output, can also serve as a radiator in a small bathroom.

Dryers come in a variety of appearances, including ladder types, turnable types, and others.

== Advantages and disadvantages ==
=== Advantages ===
Hanger for a heated towel rail

Towel warmers dry towels more quickly. Towel warmers come in varied shapes. There are towel warmers of different sizes, from (50 by 70 centimetres (20 in × 28 in)) to those two metres (6 ft 7 in) in height.

=== Disadvantages ===
Insulating a room heater slows the heating of the room. Another is that the flow of heating fluid through a towel rail, optimised for heating and drying towels, is generally the reverse of that of a simple room-heating radiator, which is optimised for heat transfer to air convecting through it.

== See also ==
- Radiator (heating)
- Radiator reflector
- Thermostatic radiator valve
