= Radiator cabinet =

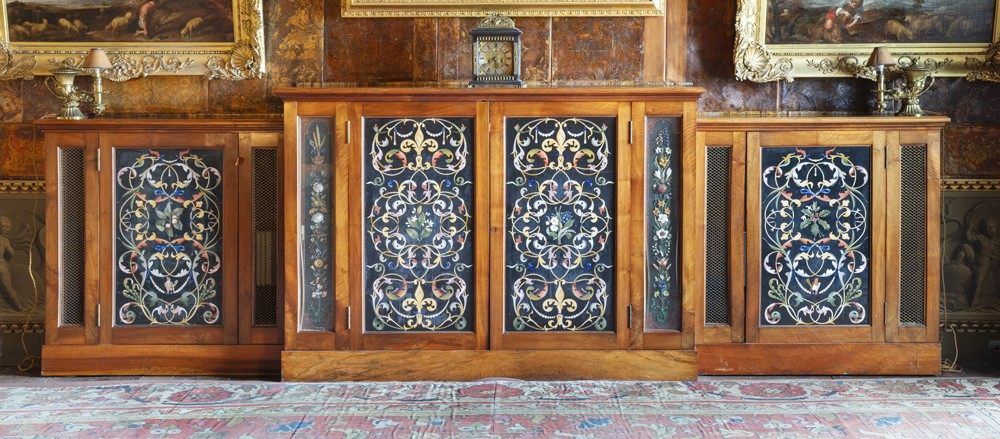
Buoninsegni brothers' pietra dura radiator cover, Kingston Lacy

A radiator cabinet is a structure, often made from wood, that is fixed around a radiator or heater thus concealing it from view. It also provides protection against contact with the radiant surface. Radiator cabinets are also known as radiator covers, and are typically constructed with a decorative matrix of holes or slots to minimise obstruction to air movement.

== History ==
The first radiator cabinet is thought to have been manufactured at some point during the Victorian era. The latter part of the 19th century saw greater emphasis placed on attractive and elegant home design. The old cast iron radiators and pipes were regarded as an eyesore and the desire to cover these blemishes led to the introduction of decorative radiator cabinets.
