= Bukhari (heater) =

Space heater, typically wood-burning

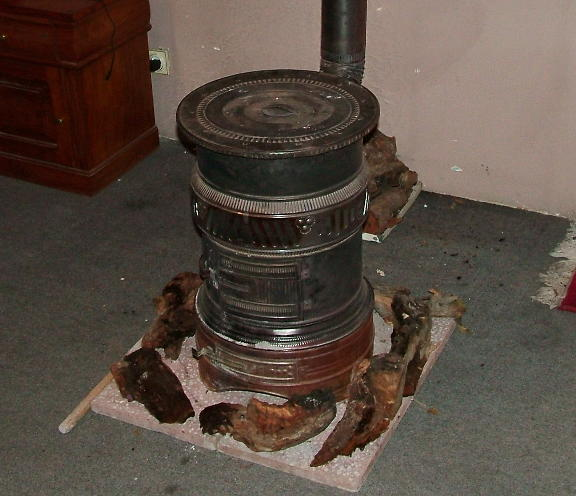
A bukhari in a house in Karte Se, Kabul, Afghanistan in 2006

A bukhāri (Persian بُخاری) is a traditional space heater, typically a wood-burning stove, from Central Asia and northern areas of the Indian subcontinent. Bukharis consist of a wide cylindrical fire chamber at the base in which wood, charcoal or other fuel is burned, and a narrower cylinder on the top that helps heat the room and acts as a chimney. The base of an Indian bukhari is wider than that of most western wood-burning stoves. Bukharis are found in the entire northern belt of the region, i.e. Afghanistan, Tajikistan, northern Pakistan, North India, Nepal, Bhutan and Northeast India.

== Etymology ==
The term bukhār is a Persian word meaning heat or fever. In modern Persian, the term bukhari generically refers to a heater.

== Use in poultry farming ==
Bukharis are in widespread use by poultry farmers in North India to keep birds warm during winter nights.

== Fuel alternatives and conservation ==
Forest conservation imperatives have resulted in the development of alternative designs for bukharis in India, including kerosene-based versions and bukharis that are more fuel-efficient than the traditional varieties.

== Hazards ==
Frequently, bukhari chimneys are not long enough to vent smoke outside the house, resulting in annual deaths from carbon monoxide poisoning in the region. Public authorities and mass media in the region often exhort people not to use angithis or bukharis in closed rooms. Bukharis also present a hazard for children due to their hot metallic surfaces and easy hinged access to the fuel-burning area.

== See also ==
- Angithi
- Space heater
