= Franz San Galli =

Russian inventor (1824–1908)

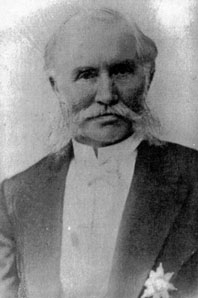
- Born: 10 March 1824
- Died: 30 July 1908 (aged 84); St. Petersburg, Russia
- Occupations: Entrepreneur; inventor

Franz San Galli (Russian: Франц Карлович Сан Галли, romanized: Frants Karlovich San Galli; 10 March 1824 – 30 July 1908) was a Russian public figure, entrepreneur and inventor. In 1882, San Galli was granted the status of a purveyor to the Imperial Court of Russia and a right to apply the imperial coat of arms to his products in recognition of their exceptional quality.

Due to his personal and business achievements, he went through the ranks from second to first guild merchant. In 1889, he was promoted to the rank of Active State Councillor. A year earlier, in 1888, he also received the title of an honorary engineer-technologist.

== Biography ==
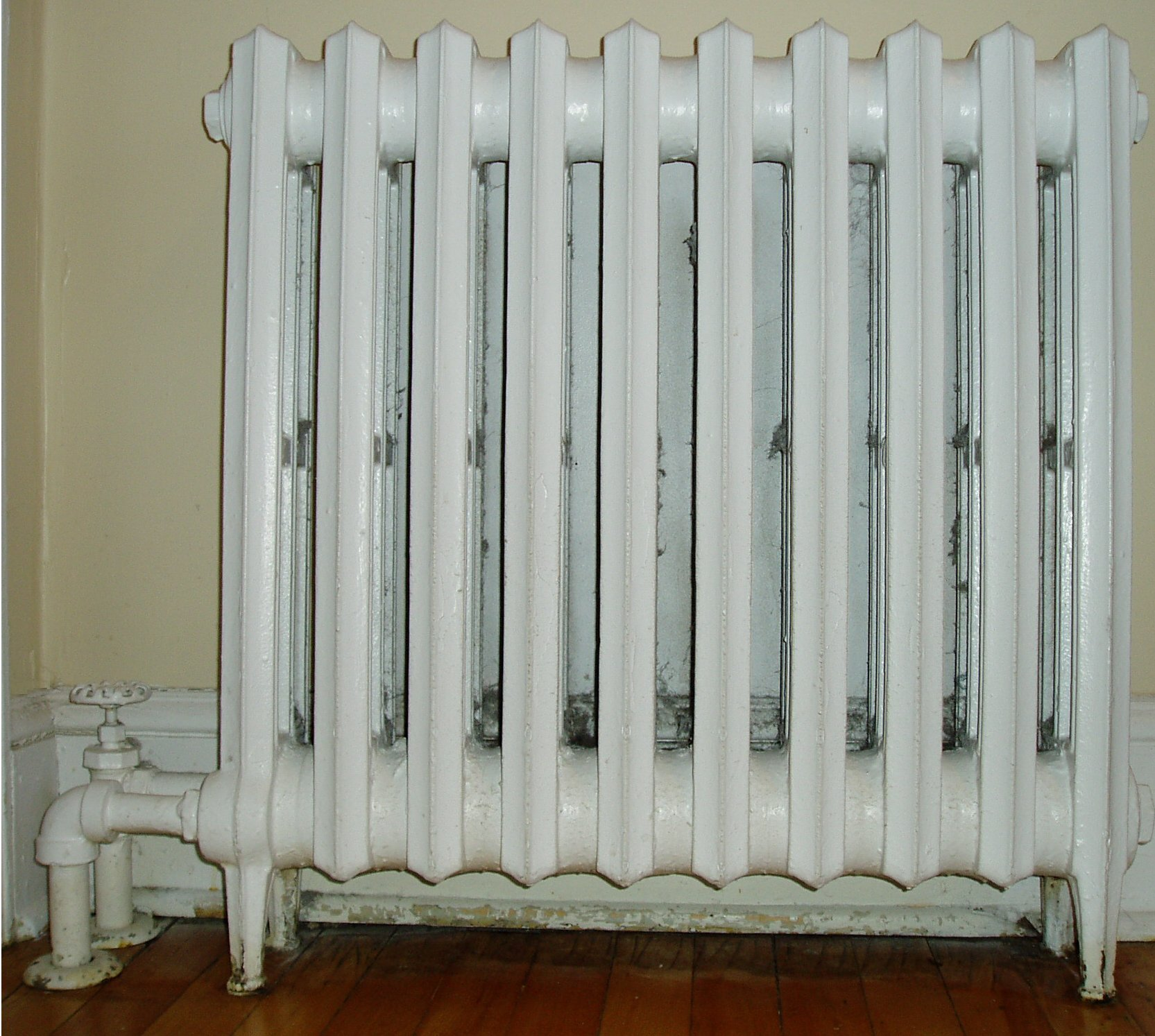
A household radiator

San Galli was born either in Stettin or Kammin, where his father Carl Sangalli, a royal tax officer, worked, in Prussian Pomerania. He was mostly of Italian and German descent. He spent most of his life in the Russian capital St. Petersburg, where he ran his business and developed his inventions.

He entered into professional activities as a trainee at a wholesale company that traded in Russian goods. At the age of 19, he departed from Stettin for St. Petersburg. Later, he proudly remembered in his memoirs that, embarking on a journey, he was provided only with 100 thalers and a mother's blessing.

San Galli started his own business in 1853 in St. Petersburg as a small mechanical workshop at 46 Ligovsky Kanal with 12 employees and a commercial outlet at 60 Nevsky Prospect. Quite soon, he was joined by his brother Robert, who permanently resided in Russia and helped him run an ever-growing business.

As a businessman, he paid special attention to gaining a reputation as well as increasing his competitiveness. His personal motto in German read "Ohne Hast, ohne Rast" ("Without haste, without rest").

San Galli constantly took part in exhibitions and industrial fair contests. Even at an early stage of his career, he had a diverse productive capacity and trade to pursue new business opportunities. In 1861, at one of his first exhibitions, he displayed his products in 22 categories.

A major breakthrough in business came a few years later when San Galli received a contract for the renovation of the heating system in the Imperial greenhouses in Tsarskoye Selo. He is credited as one of the inventors of the radiator, which significantly contributed to modern central heating systems. He gave it the name "hot-box".

San Galli's claim as the inventor of the heating radiator is disputed. It appears that he is one of several people who contributed to the development of the heating innovation. San Galli received a radiator patent in 1857, while American Joseph Nason developed a primitive radiator in 1841 and received a number of U.S. patents for hot water and steam heating. Nason's patent for tapered pipe threads in particular is cited by 1930s writer Ara Marcus Daniels as the key development in the birth of the radiator.

San Galli died in St. Petersburg on 30 July 1908.
