= Equivalence of direct radiation =

Standardized comparison method for space-heating radiators

Equivalence of direct radiation (EDR) is a standardized comparison method for estimating the output ability of space-heating radiators and convectors.

Measured in square feet, the reference standard for EDR is the mattress radiator invented by Stephen J. Gold in the mid 19th century.

One square foot (9.3 dm^{2}) of EDR is able to liberate 240 British thermal units per hour (70 W) when surrounded by 70 °F (21 °C) air and filled with steam of approximately 215 °F (102 °C) temperature and one psi of pressure.

EDR was originally a measure of the actual surface area of radiators. As radiator (and later convector) design became more complicated and compact, the relationship of actual surface area to EDR became arbitrary. Laboratory methods based on the condensation of steam allowed for very accurate measurements.

While now somewhat archaic, EDR is still computed and used for sizing steam boilers and radiators, and for modifying and troubleshooting older heating systems using steam or hot water.
