= Sofono =

Sofono Electrical Division of Federated Foundries Ltd was formed in Falkirk, Scotland, in 1959 to manufacture and market electric heaters from the Grange-Camelon Iron Company Limited (also known as the Grangemouth Iron Company Limited). Federated Foundries had previously produced open-fire cookers/water heaters and fireplace grates under the Sofono brand name, and continued to do so. From 1959, Sofono produced the well-known Spacemaster range of convector and radiant-convector heaters, described as a "flying saucer" shape because they were circular. They also produced other electric heaters such as the Saturn range of domestic reflector fires, the Jupiter range of industrial infrared heaters, and the Sofono-flame range of infra-red coal-effect heaters.

Look here for an example of a Sofono Spacemaster electric heater
