= Oil heater =

Type of convection heater

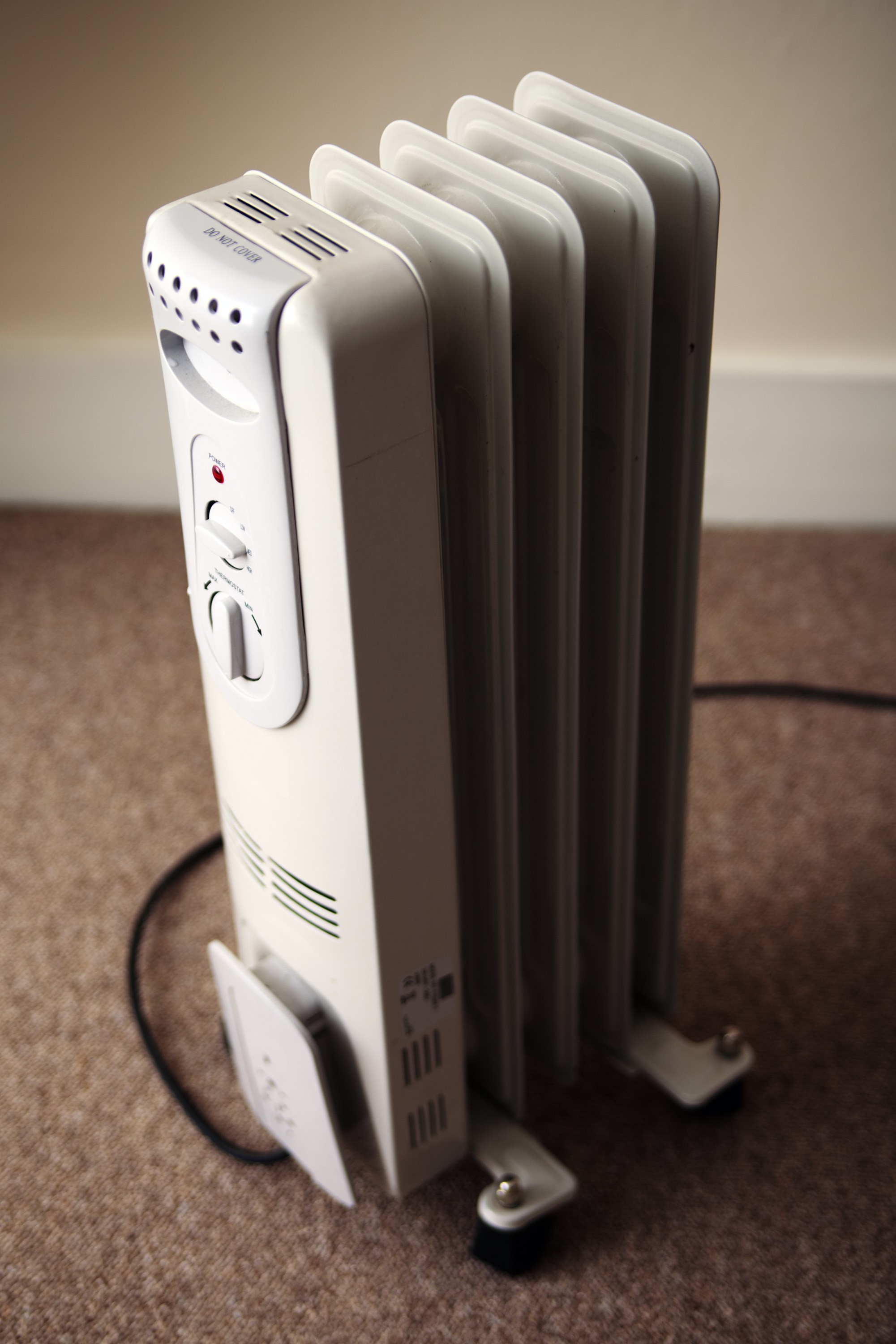
A typical oil heater

An oil heater, also known as an oil-filled heater, oil-filled radiator, or column heater, is a common form of convection heater used in domestic heating. Although filled with oil, it is electrically heated and does not involve burning any oil fuel; the oil is used as a heat reservoir (buffer).

== Function ==
Oil heaters consist of metal columns with cavities inside, where heat-transfer oil flows freely around the heater. A heating element at the base of the heater heats the diathermic oil, which flows around the cavities of the heater by convection. The oil has a relatively high specific heat capacity and a high boiling point. The high specific heat capacity allows the oil to effectively transfer thermal energy from the heating element, while the oil's high boiling point allows it to remain in the liquid phase for heating, so that the heater does not have to be a high-pressure vessel.

The heating element heats the oil, which transfers heat to the metal wall through convection, through the walls via conduction, and then to the surroundings via air convection and thermal radiation. The columns of oil heaters are typically constructed as thin fins, such that the surface area of the metal columns is large relative to the amount of oil and element that provides the warmth. A large surface area allows more air to be in contact with the heater at any point in time, allowing for the heat to be transferred more effectively, which results in a surface temperature that is safe enough to touch. The relatively large specific heat capacity of the oil and metal parts means this type of heater takes a few minutes to heat up and cool down, providing short-term thermal storage.

== Efficiency ==
Although oil heaters are more expensive to run and provide far less spatial heating than gas heaters, they are still commonly used in bedrooms and other small or medium-sized enclosed areas. This is because gas heaters, especially without a flue, are not suitable for bedroom use; gas heaters cannot be used in confined spaces due to the reduced oxygen and emissions produced. This leaves electrically powered heaters, such as oil heaters, fan heaters, and heat pumps, as the only alternatives.

Several efficiency metrics can be measured about heaters, such as the efficiency of heating a room with a given amount of power, the efficiency of the electrical generator that powers the heater, and the power loss from transporting the electricity over power lines. Measures may also consider how effectively a heater keeps the temperature of a space above a certain point. Such measures would find inefficiencies in heating an already warm room. Many heaters (the majority of available models) are equipped with a thermostat to prevent this inefficient heating, which in turn reduces running costs. This feature was much more common in oil heaters than in cheaper fan heaters until recently, and because of this, many older oil heaters will be cheaper and more efficient to run than their contemporary fan heaters that lack a thermostat.

Typical oil heaters range in power consumption and output from 500 to 2,400 watts, with their length and number of columns being roughly proportional to their power rating. A 2400-watt oil heater is usually approximately 1 metre (3.3 ft) in length. Operating costs are generally calculated based on a linear relationship between the heater's wattage and the duration of operation. A 500-watt heater will take at least twice as long to reach the same thermostat setting as a 1000-watt unit; however, the total electricity consumption will be the same for both. Additionally, the rate of heat flow from a heater to the air directly in contact with it is higher when there is a greater temperature difference between the two.

All electrically resistant heaters are essentially 100% efficient at converting incoming electric energy into heat. However, since most of an oil heater's main electricity is produced by coal, oil, or gas generators with ~30% efficiency, electric heat is often less efficient and more expensive than combustion heaters (which directly convert oil or gas to heat). By contrast, an electric heat pump used for home heating typically has an efficiency well above 100%, expressed as its coefficient of performance, because it moves outside heat into a room rather than generating it.

== Safety and features ==
The primary risks of oil heaters are fires and burns. In both regards, they are generally more dangerous than heat pumps, hydronics, and air conditioning, but less dangerous than electric fan heaters or bar radiators, due to the surface temperature of any given type of heater.

Most modern small heaters have some form of tilt sensor to cut power if they are knocked over or placed on an unstable surface, which can reduce the risk of fire if a heater is knocked over.

Despite the average surface temperature of the heater in normal operation is considerably low, the extra thermal resistance of clothing on the heater can cause its surface temperature to rise to the material's autoignition temperature. Some oil heaters contain strong warnings to avoid operation in damp areas (such as bathrooms or laundry rooms) as moisture and humidity can damage components of the heater itself.

Oil heaters can explode when their thermal fuses fail to trigger a shutdown, which can cause fire, thick black smoke, unpleasant odors, oil on walls and other surfaces, and disfiguring scalding.

Some companies offer oil heaters with a fan to increase the quality of airflow over the heater. As it is constantly bringing the colder air from the room into contact with the heater, this can improve the rate of heat flow from the heater and into the room.
