= Radiator reflector =

Heat reflector behind a domestic radiator

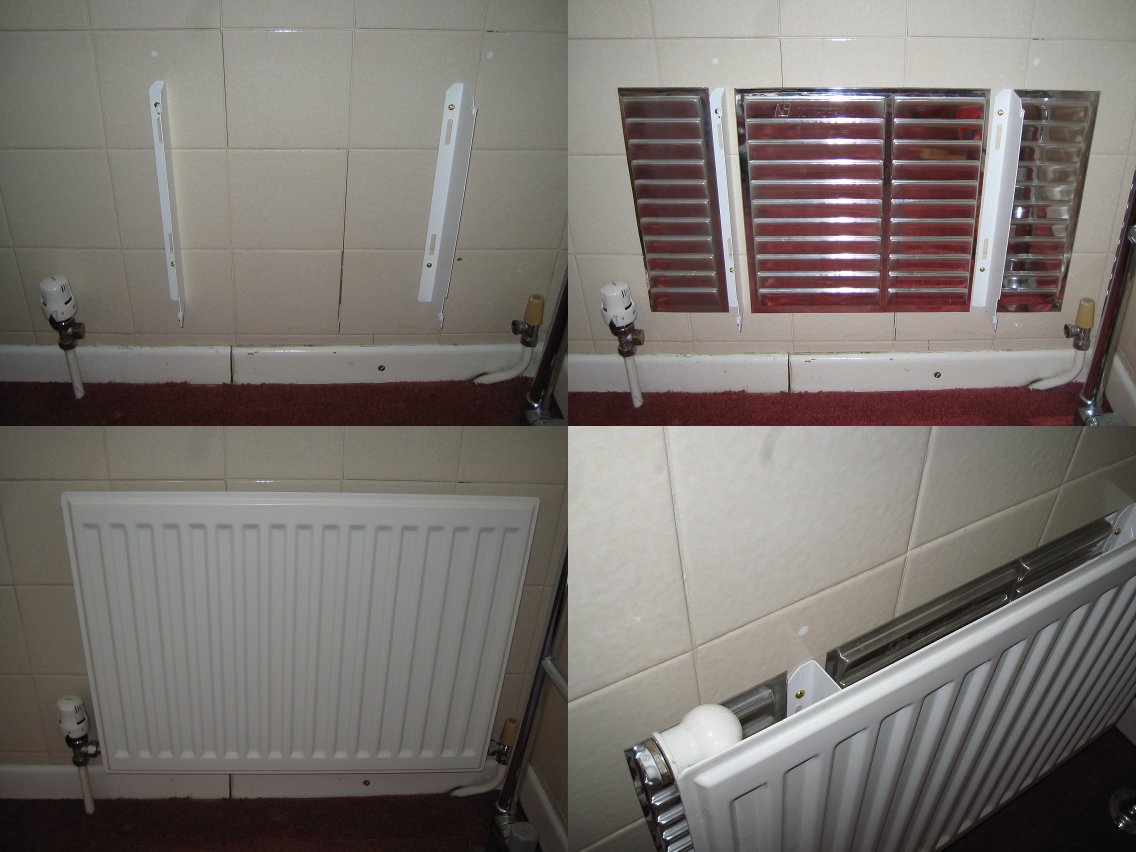
Radiator reflector panels being installed behind a domestic radiator

A radiator reflector is a thin sheet or foil applied to the wall behind, and closely spaced from, a domestic heating radiator. The intention is to reduce heat losses into the wall by reflecting radiant heat away from the wall. It is a form of radiant barrier and is intended to reduce energy losses and hence decrease fuel expenditure.

== Effectiveness ==
Studies based both on modelling and experiments have demonstrated modest improvements in energy losses through the walls of houses through this method. Harris shows that plain aluminum foil was only "marginally" less effective than a proprietarily-shaped foil that claimed to avoid temperature stratification. Harris reports that "reductions in the overall energy consumption of the [test] room of up to 6% were recorded by installing [plain] foil behind a radiator, while the heat loss through the area of wall immediately behind the radiator fell to less than 30% of the original value". In his three-cubic-metre test room with a 1 × 0.5 m radiator and walls of average U value 0.44 W/m^{2}K, he found that for a radiator temperature of 43 °C the heat flux through the wall behind the radiator reduced from 7.1 to 3.1 W/m^{2}. Note that the average heat loss in the room was not reduced by such a large percentage as only part of the surface of the room was covered by radiators. He concludes that "in the test room used, which is the size of a small bedroom or sitting room, the total energy saved in a typical year in the UK’s climate would be of the order of 60 kW⋅h".

Baldinelli et al. support these findings and note that their "results show how the performance of the reflecting panel depends strictly on the insulation level of the external wall facing the radiator; more specifically, efficiency increases when the thermal resistance decreases, reaching energy savings of up to 8.8% in worst insulation conditions."

Although the foils are termed "reflectors", they do not have much effect on radiated heat or its reflection. As radiators work at a relatively low temperature, the Stefan–Boltzmann law (Note: The Stefan–Boltzmann law states that the effectiveness of a thermal radiator is proportional to the fourth power of its absolute temperature. A hot-water radiator at 77 °C (350 K) has only 1/4 the radiated power of a stove at 220 °C (493 K), or 1/16 that of a radiant element at 427 °C (700 K)) means that they are weak radiators of heat. Most heat from a domestic radiator is as convection currents of heated air. Where a reflector foil also has some insulating ability against conduction (i.e. losses through the wall), it may have some useful effect. This is most pronounced when the wall itself has poor insulation performance: in a wall constructed to modern standards of insulation, even this effect may be reduced to a negligible benefit.

The effect of placing a 10mm combined insulation and reflection behind radiators is about the same as that of 15mm insulation without a reflective layer. When the wall thickness behind the radiator is at minimum 1980 German standards this will reduce total heat losses of a building by about 4%. For a (by 1980s standards) well-insulated building heat losses can be reduced by about 1.6%. (Note: N. König: "Der Einfluß von wäremreflektierenden Folien in Heizkörpernischen auf den Heizenergieverbrauch eines Hauses" https://www.ibp.fraunhofer.de/content/dam/ibp/de/documents/Publikationen/IBP-Mitteilungen-optimiert/058.pdf)

A more effective DIY radiator reflector is a thin insulating layer (against conduction) of a lightweight insulator such as expanded polystyrene foam veneer (Note: Widely sold in 2mm sheet rolls as an insulator beneath wallpaper.) or 3mm polyethylene foam, as used for laminate flooring underlay.

== Commercially available products ==
There are only two radiator reflectors approved for use in the UK Government's Carbon Emission Reduction Target (CERT) Scheme administered by Ofgem (the UK Regulator of energy companies) – Radflek and Heatkeeper (also called Novitherm).

== See also ==
- U value
