= Enhanced Data Rate =

Enhanced Data Rate may refer to:

- One of the signalling modes introduced in version 2.0 of the Bluetooth protocol, supporting 3 Mbit/s signaling rate
- One of the physical layer specifications of the InfiniBand protocol, supporting 25 Gbit/s signalling rate
- Enhanced Data Rates for GSM Evolution
