= Fan heater =

Heat producing machine to increase temperature of an enclosed space

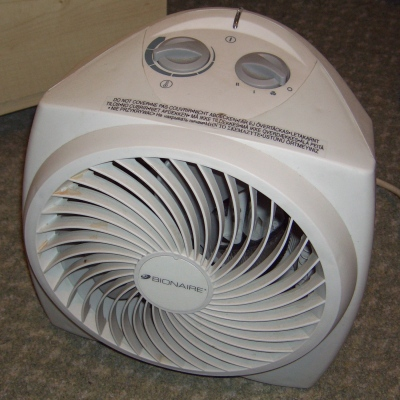
Portable fan heater

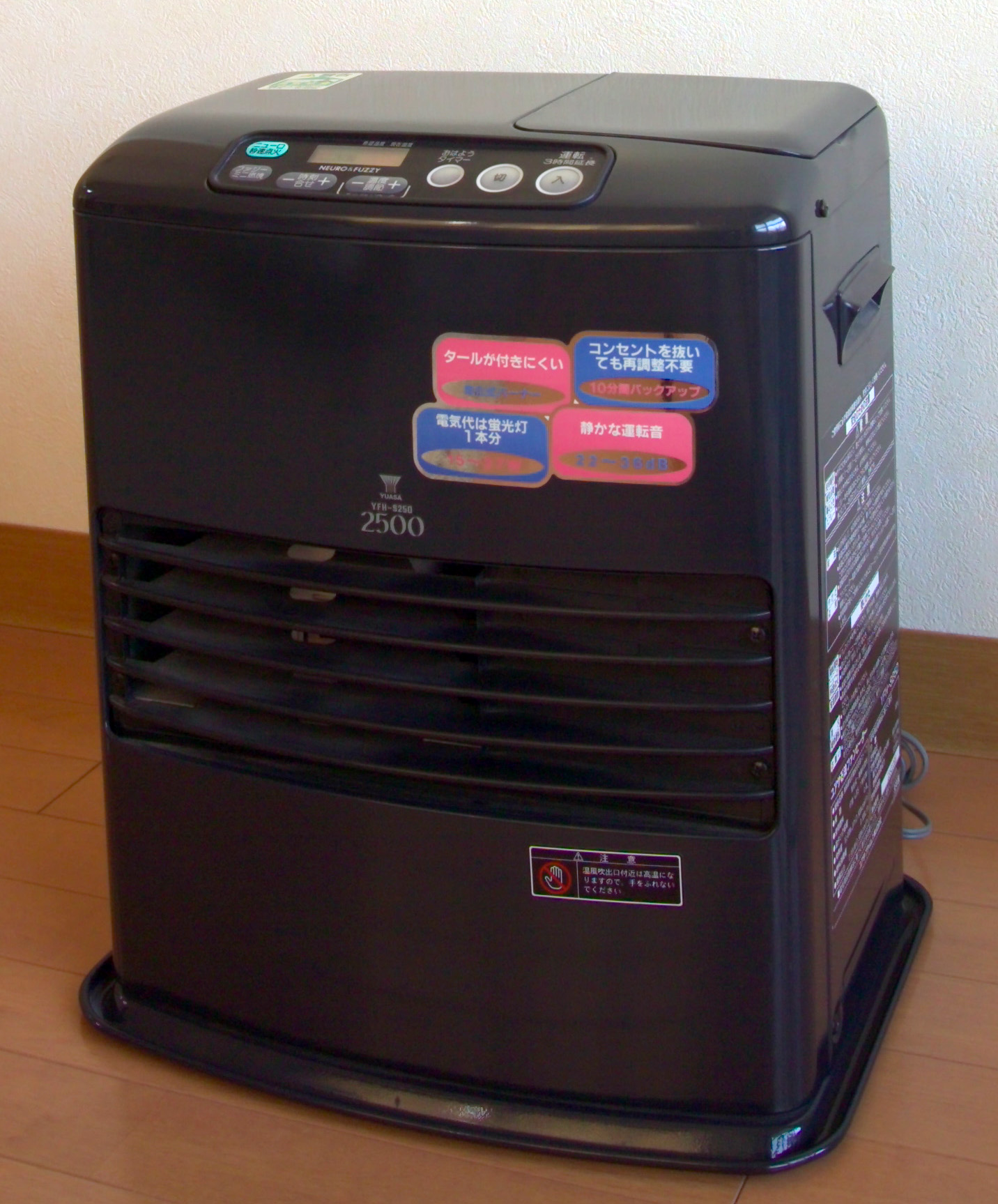
A Japanese kerosene fan heater that burns kerosene for fuel. It contains an electric fan and computer controls.

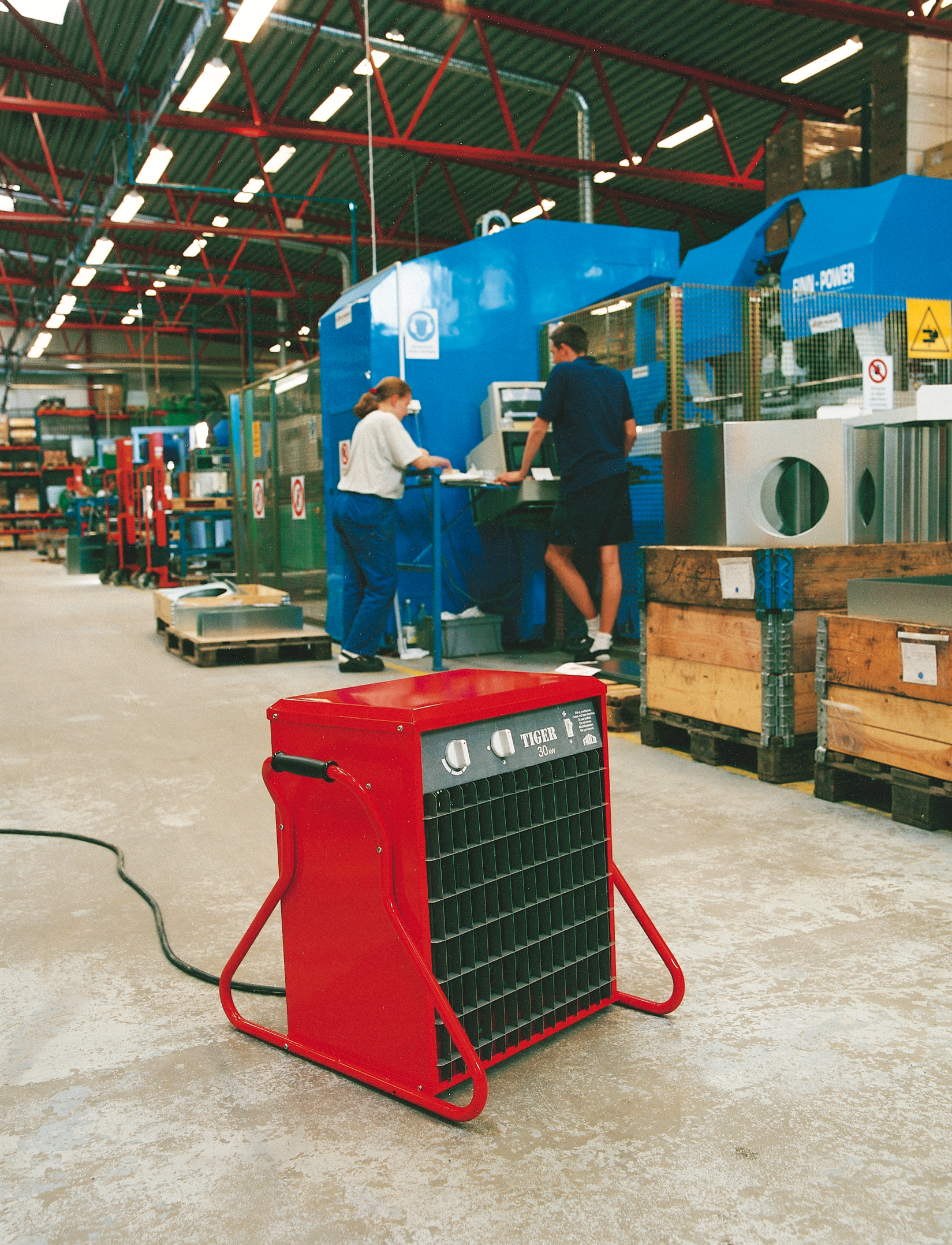
Electric fan heater

A fan heater, also called a blow heater, is a heater that works by using a fan to pass air over a heat source (e.g. a heating element). This heats up the air, which then leaves the heater, warming up the surrounding room. They can heat an enclosed space such as a room faster than a heater without a fan, but like any fan, create a degree of noise.

== Cost and efficiency ==
Electric fan heaters can be cheaper than other heaters due to simple construction. The fan carries heat away from the device, which can be made smaller without overheating. The relatively small amount of electricity used to operate the fan is converted to additional heat, so that efficiency remains at 100%.

Electric fan heaters can be more expensive to run than fuel powered heaters due to the cost of electricity. This makes them best suited to occasional use rather than as regularly used heat sources.

Residential electric fan heaters are limited in capacity by the voltage of the electrical system. In 110/120 V countries, 15 A is a typical maximum, which results in many models being 1.5 kW. In 220/230 V countries, 3 kW is a maximum, however 2 kW is commonly used as it is adequate for most cases. Industrial fan heaters can draw more power than smaller commercial models.

== Control ==
Most modern fan heaters have a power setting to determine power output. Some also have a thermostat which switches off heating when the desired ambient temperature is reached. They do not maintain perfect room temperature control, since:

- the thermostat is usually attached to the body of the heater, and senses temperature there.
- the basic bimetal thermostats usually have significant hysteresis.
- Remote sensors and thermostats with less hysteresis are available but are less common, as they are more expensive and the basic fan heater is satisfactory for most purposes.

== Heat sources ==
While the fans in fan heaters are electrically powered, various heat sources may be used:

- Electric heating elements are common, and used in portable plug-in electric heaters. Although they may supply several kilowatts of heat, such heaters are usually small as the electric element itself is small. Since heat is removed by the fan, the body of the heater does not need to be an effective heat sink.
- Hot water tubing is used where the heat is provided by a hydronic heating system.
- Gas, kerosene, and sometimes other fuels, such as used engine oil, are burnt in high-power fan heaters.

== Safety ==
Electric fan heaters are unsealed appliances with live electric parts inside, so they are not safe to use in wet environments because of the risk of electrical injury if moisture provides a conductive path to electrically live parts. Electric fan heaters usually have a thermal fuse close to the heating element(s) to prevent overheating damage in the event of fan failure or air intakes becoming blocked, and a tip-over switch to shut the heater off when the fan outlet is not in the required orientation. Metal-cased heaters may perform better in the case of possible fire-causing faults than plastic-cased ones, since the case will stay intact and is not flammable, but the metal case presents a higher risk of electric shock if a heater malfunctions.

Portable fuel-powered fan heaters release all the fumes of combustion into the room, creating a risk of poisoning by carbon monoxide and carbon dioxide. Most installed fuel fan heaters in the first world use a heat exchanger and external ventilation, avoiding that risk by venting the combustion gases to the outdoors.

== Internal parts ==
=== Residential model ===
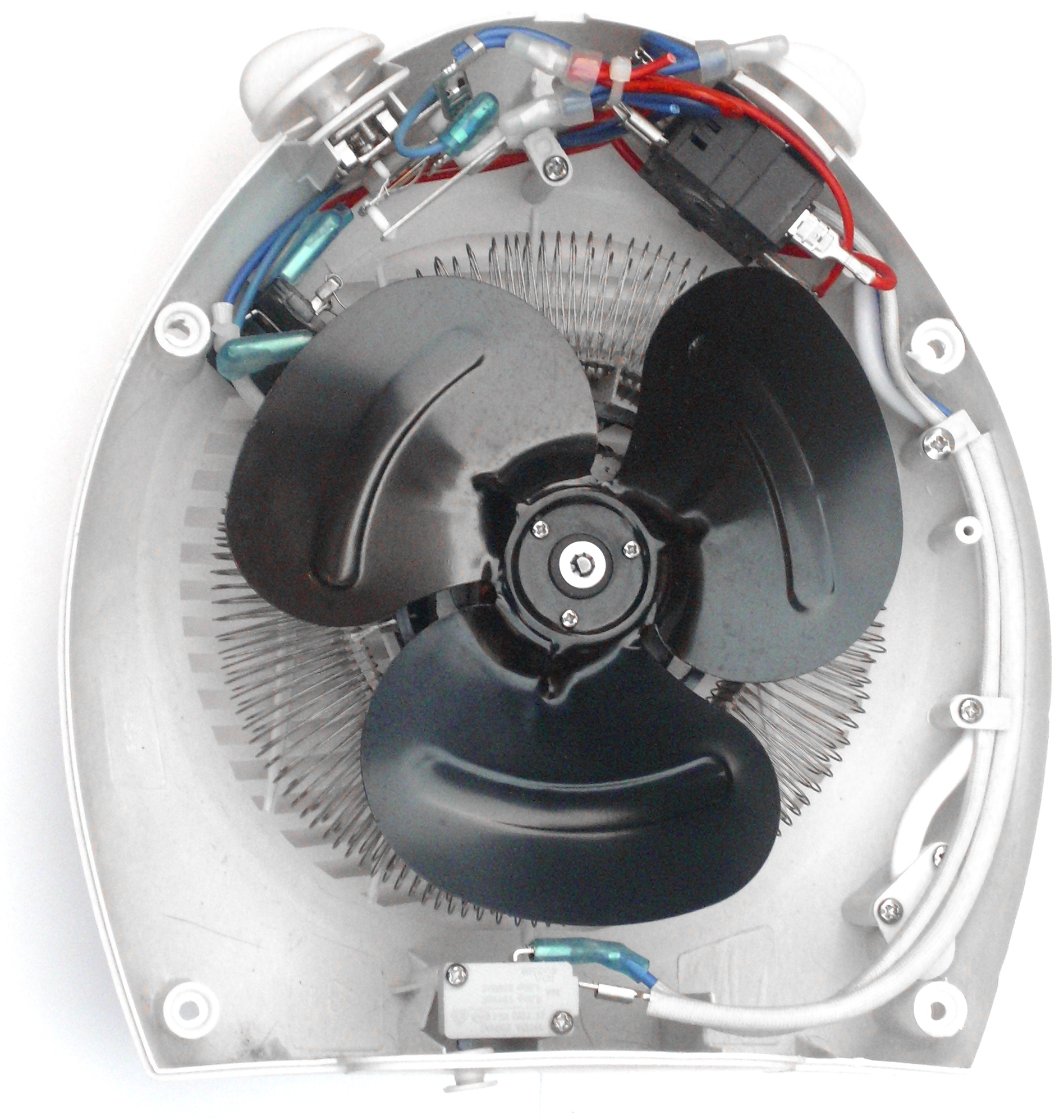
Typical fan heater's internal parts

The picture immediately to the right (the top on the mobile site) shows most of the component parts of a typical plug-in electric fan heater.

- The heating element is the coiled wire frame located behind the fan blades.
- The thermostat is at the top left.
- The heat (wattage) selector switch is at the top right.
- The switch at the bottom is a normally open switch that serves as a "tipover switch" safety device: as long as the heater is standing upright, the switch is engaged and the circuit is closed.
- The grip for the power cord is at the bottom right.

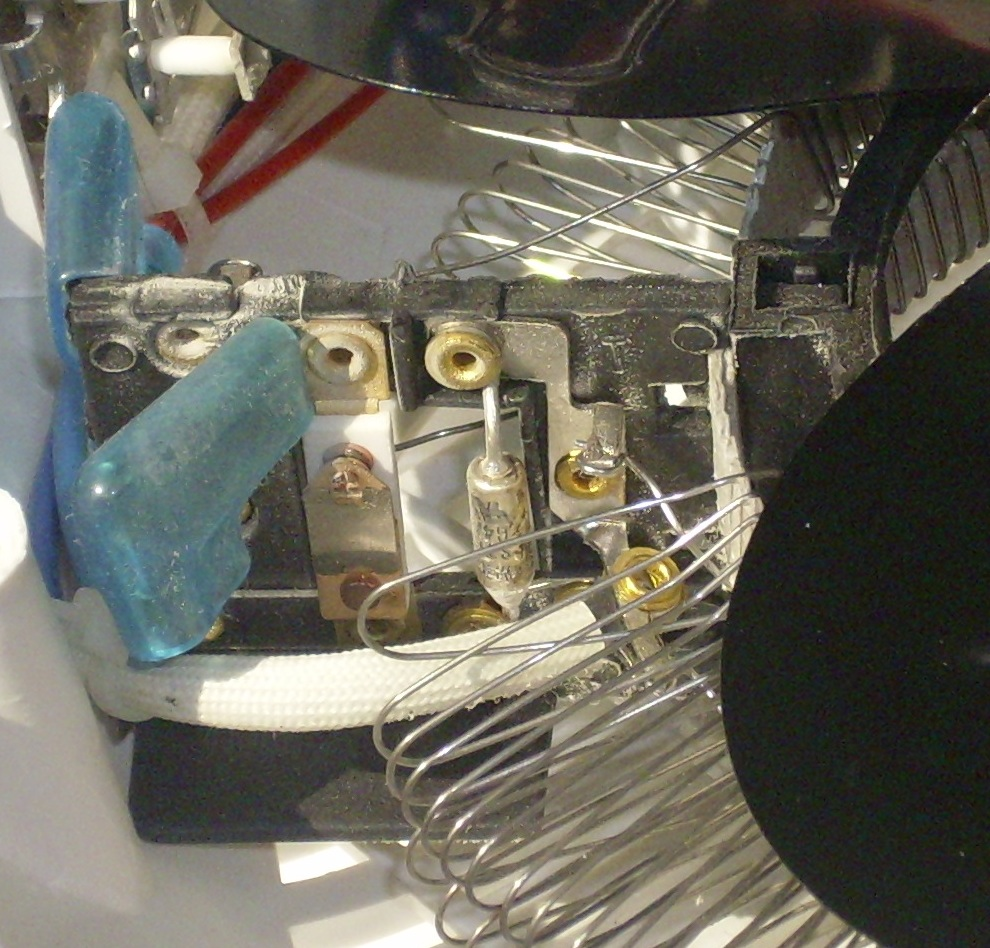
Overheat cutouts

The next picture shows the two overheat cutouts. The bimetal cutout (left) operates if the device overheats because the intake is blocked or the fan fails, and resets automatically or manually depending on specification, once the heater cools after the operational fault is corrected. The thermal fuse (right) is a fail-safe backup device that will blow and disconnect the heating element permanently should the bimetal cutout fail to operate (e.g. due to its contacts welding together) and in so doing prevent extreme overheating which could result in a fire.

=== Industrial model ===
Industrial fan heaters use high-output finned heating elements in front of a fan to provide a larger airflow and higher kilowatt rating than many smaller residential fan heaters. Industrial fan heaters can be used in warehouses, shipping containers, clean rooms, shops and other general purpose heating applications. They can also be used as dryers or dehumidifiers with modified attachments or mountings. Portable industrial fan heaters tend to range from around 1.5 kW up to about 45 kW with either axial or centrifugal fans and various staged controls and over-temperature safety limit controls.

== See also ==
- Convection heater
- Electric heating
- Fan coil unit
- HVAC
- Unit ventilator
