= Convection heater =

Type of heating device

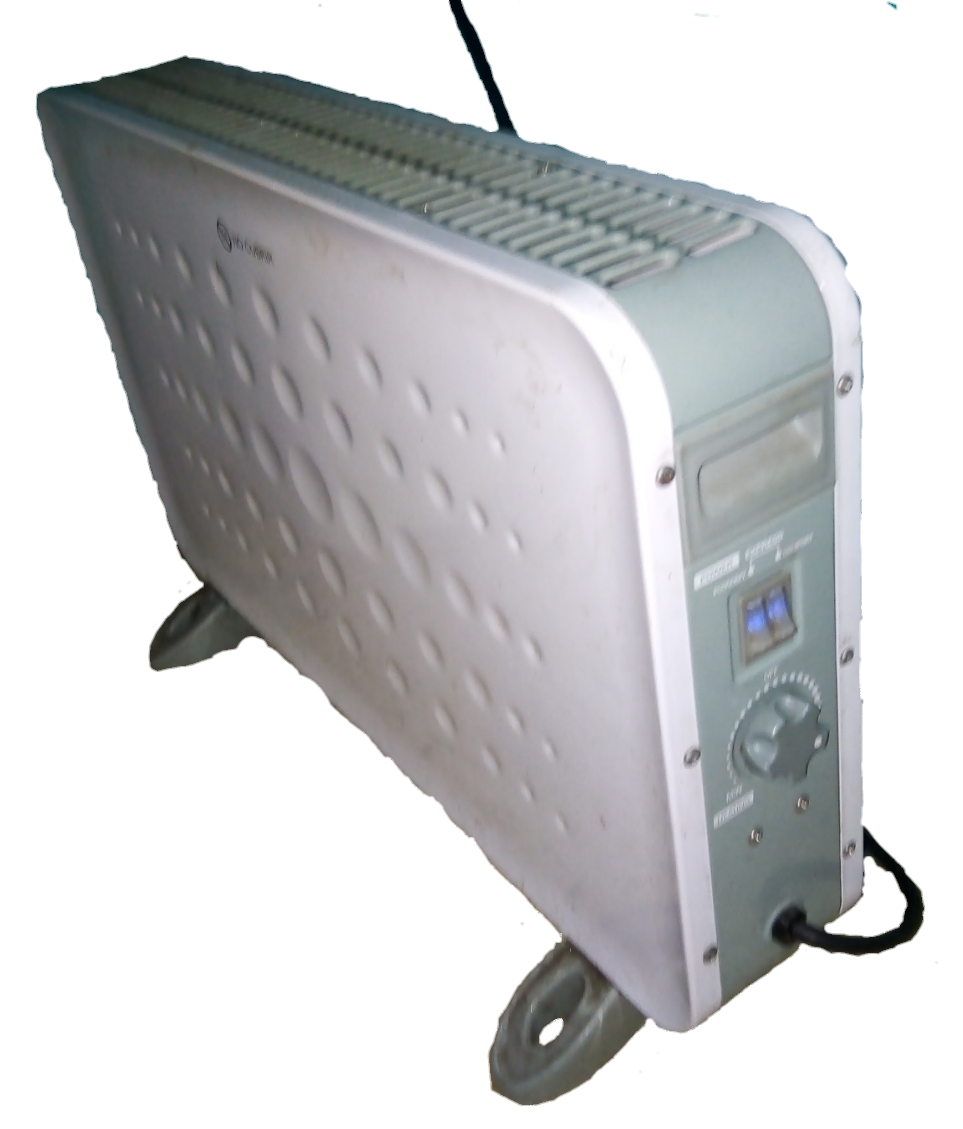
A convection heater for single-room use

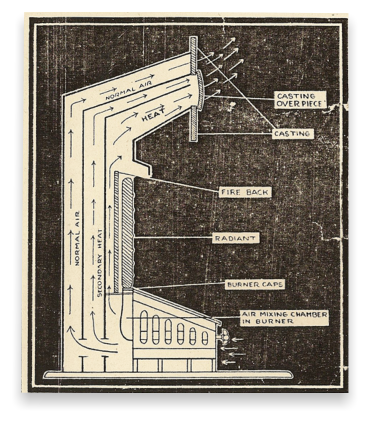
Illustration of the Model "S" Convection Heater by Sala Heater & Mantel, 1924

A convection heater, also known as a convector heater, is a type of heater that utilizes convection currents to heat and circulate air. These currents move through the appliance and across its heating element, using thermal conduction to warm the air and decrease its density relative to colder air, causing it to rise.

== History ==
Ancient heating systems, including hearths, furnaces, and stoves, operated primarily through convection. Fixed central hearths, which were first excavated and retrieved in Greece, date back to 2500 BC, whereas crude fireplaces were used as early as the 800s AD and in the 13th century, when castles in Europe were built with fireplaces with a crude form of chimney.

Developments in convection heating technology included the publication of the very first manual on fireplace design called Mechanique du Feu in 1713, the creation of stoves with thermostatic control in 1849, and the rise of numerous cast iron stove manufacturers during the American Civil War.

The Model "S", illustrated by the Sala Heater & Mantel Co. in Dallas, Texas in 1924, is an example of an early model of a convection space heater. This model consisted of three stoves and was considered to be a highly efficient radiant type of gas heater at the time. It utilized radiant heat, and supplemented its power by drawing cold air through the facing, heating it, and forcing it out through the register. This allowed air circulation while maintaining a cool exterior on the appliance.

These early developments, along with the technological advancements made possible by electricity and inventions of tools like thermostats, gave way for the design of modern convection heaters.

== Types ==
Convection heaters are commonly classified according to their power source. Electric convection heaters use electricity, while combustion or gas-fired heaters use gas, propane, or any other type of fuel. For the heating element, convection heaters usually use metal coils, nickel-chromium, resistance wire, thermal fluids, or ceramic.

=== Panel heater ===
A panel heater is a type of electric convection heater commonly used for heating rooms in residential and small commercial settings. They are often mistaken for electric radiators, which are devices that use radiant heating and transfer heat directly to objects rather than using the air as a medium. Panel heaters are typically used in complement to some other primary or central heating system. They are usually fitted with time and temperature controls.

=== Fan heater ===
Fan heaters combine the warming capability of a heater and air distribution capacity of a fan. The earliest fan heaters became available in the 1950s, right after the invention of tangential fans. Modern fan heaters have variable-speed fans that can work independently from the heating element.

=== Institutional convector heater ===
Institutional convector heaters are heavy-duty heaters designed strictly for commercial and industrial use. Their construction is designed to reach a broad surface area.

=== Oil heater ===
An oil heater, also called a column heater, is electrically heated and uses oil as a heat reservoir. Because oil has a high heat capacity and a high boiling point, it is a suitable heat pathway between the heating element and the cavities of the heater unit.

=== Gas-fired convection heater ===
Gas-fired convection heaters use a gas supply instead of electricity. These heaters consist of a gas burner, an air filter, gas valves, a blower, and a thermostat.

== See also ==
- Radiator
- Electric heating
