= Space heater =

Household appliance that heats a single room or other small area

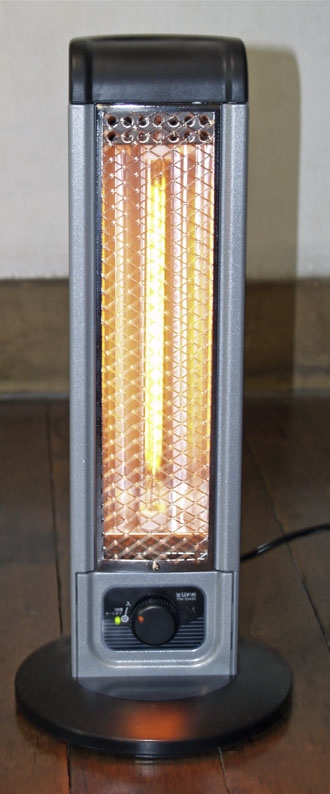
Electric infrared space heater

A space heater is an appliance used to heat a single small- to medium-sized area. This type of heater can be contrasted with central heating, which distributes heat to multiple areas.

== Types ==
=== Dominant mode of heat transfer ===
All space heaters transfer heat to their environment via some combination of the three fundamental modes of heat transfer: convection, radiation, and conduction. Typically heaters are designed with either convection or radiation as the sole dominant mode.

==== Convective heaters ====
Convective space heaters utilize convection to transfer heat from the power source to a space. These heaters typically rely on either natural or forced convection. Natural convection is a phenomenon where temperature variations in an environment generate fluid flow.

Forced-convection heaters utilize a device like a fan to generate air flow and spread heat at a fast pace. Sometimes called fan heaters, these are often cheap but lack in efficiency and versatility.

==== Radiant heaters ====
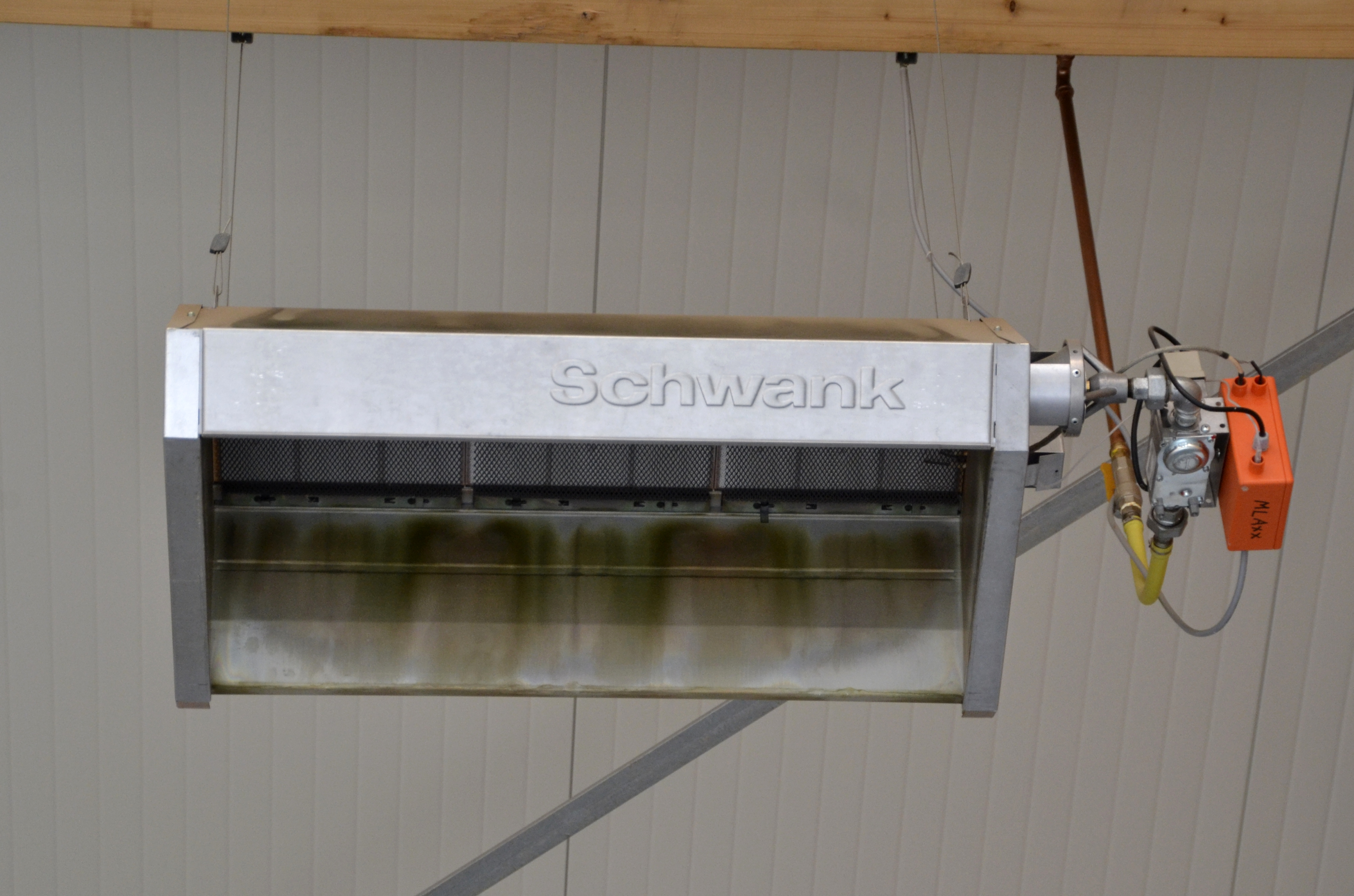
Gas-fired high-intensity space heater

Radiant space heaters transfer heat directly to bodies in front of them using thermal radiation. Thermal radiation is a process by which objects at a high temperature emit heat in the form of electromagnetic waves. These heaters are often designed such that the frequency of the emitted waves are in the infrared part of the electromagnetic spectrum.

The materials used in radiant heaters can vary. Halogen heaters have tungsten filaments in sealed quartz envelopes, mounted in front of a metal reflector in a plastic case. They operate at a higher temperature than nichrome-wire heaters but not as high as incandescent light bulbs, radiating primarily in the infrared spectrum. They convert up to 86 percent of their input power to radiant energy, losing the remainder to conductive and convective heat.

==== Mixed convective and radiant heaters ====
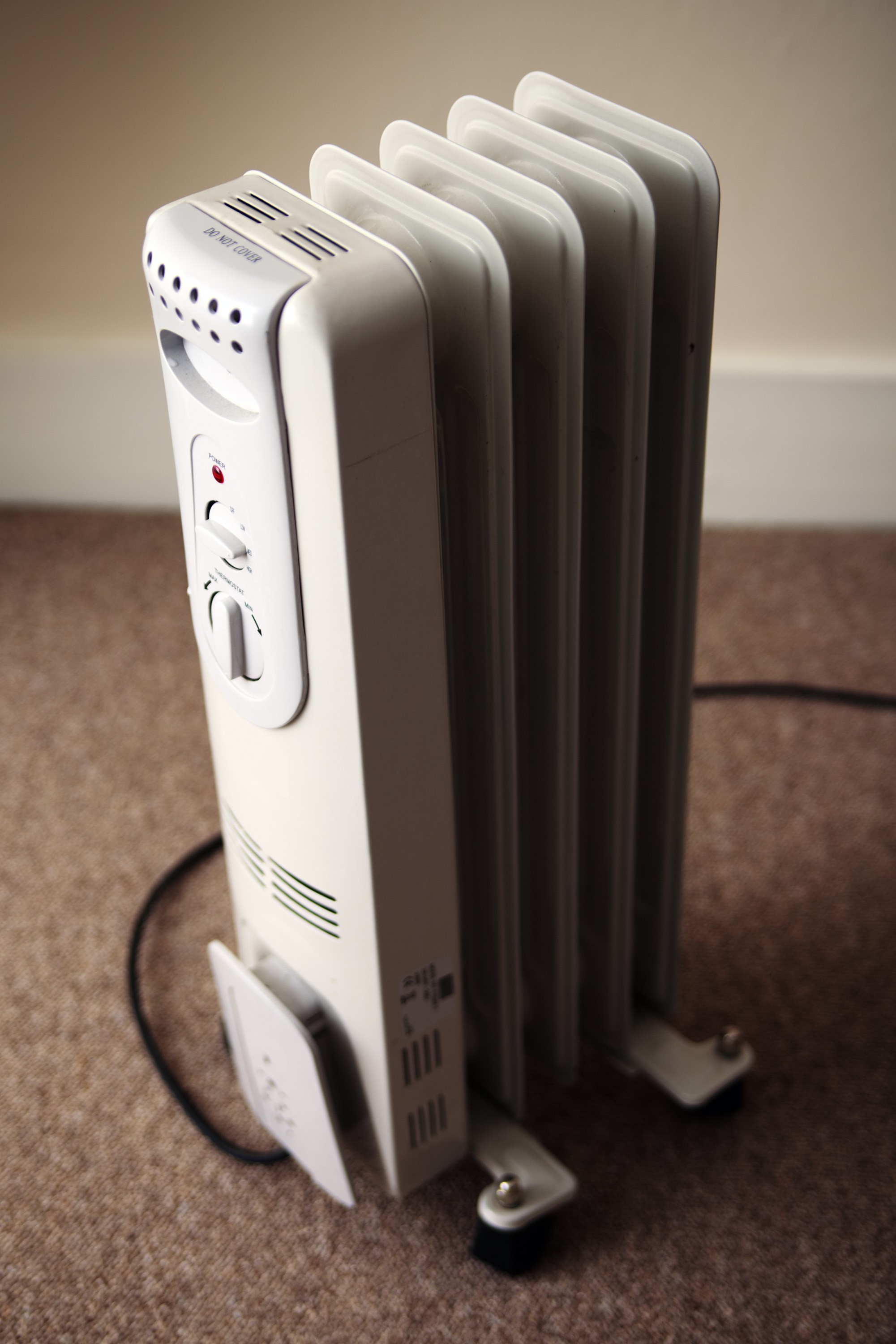
Oil heaters transfer heat by convection and radiation

Oil heaters transfer heat by convection and radiation. They can silently heat larger rooms, but take longer to heat up. Like infrared models, they lack a fan, but circulate heat according to a room's air patterns, which is why it may take longer for a user to discern a difference in temperature. By the mid-2010s, some higher-end models included more precise controls.

=== Source of power ===
The power source used in a radiant heater depends on the resources that are available. Most space heaters are powered by either electricity or combustion.

==== Electricity ====
Electric space heaters convert electricity into heat through the process of Joule heating. The main component of these heaters is called the heating element. Heating elements come in many different geometries and styles and can be used in either convective or radiant space heaters.

==== Combustion ====
Combustion space heaters convert chemical energy into heat through combustion of a fuel. These heaters often do not require electricity to function and can therefore be used off-the-grid.

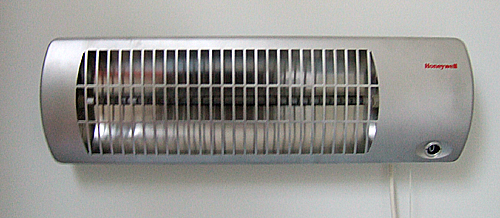
Honeywell electric infrared radiant heater

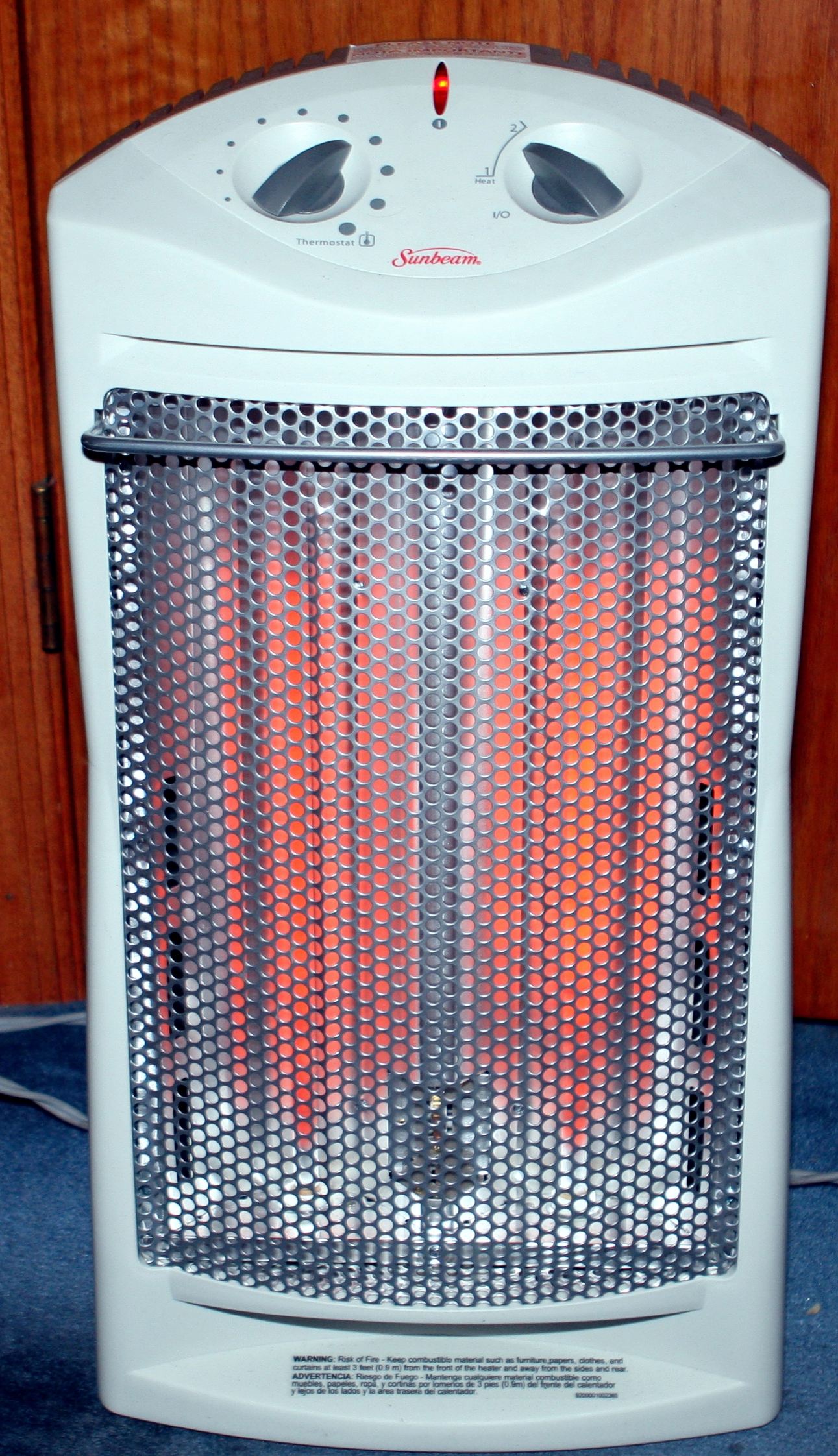
Sunbeam quartz space heater uses quartz tubing for infrared heating

== Safety ==
Fire, burns, and carbon monoxide poisoning are the main risks of space heaters. About 25,000 fires are caused by space heaters in the United States each year, resulting in about 300 deaths. Roughly 6,000 hospital emergency department visits annually in the US are caused by space heaters, mainly from burns.

=== Fire and burns ===
Improper use can increase the risk of fire and burns. Safe operation includes:

- Plugging space heaters directly into a wall outlet and not an extension cord or relocatable power tap, as they can overheat and cause fires.
- Inspecting plugs and cords periodically for cracks or damage, and replacing them if needed.
- Keeping flammable materials, such as paper, plastics, curtains, furniture, and bedding, at least 3 feet (0.9 m) away from the heater.
- Turning off the heater when the last adult leaves the room or goes to sleep and keeping children and pets three feet away from the heater.
- Placing heaters on a flat, hard, nonflammable surface.
- Avoiding the use of heaters near flammable materials such as paint or gasoline.
- Installing smoke alarms and carbon monoxide detectors nearby.

The risk is sometimes less with oil-filled heaters than those with fans, but some fan-assisted heaters have a lower risk than other oil-filled heaters.

=== Features ===
No one type of heater is safer than any other type. The risk of fire and burns can vary, depending on model and manufacturer.

=== Certifications ===
In the United States, Underwriters Laboratories' standards UL 1278 and UL 1042 (respectively for portable electric space heaters and for portable and fixed baseboard electric heaters) address heater safety. Although the General Services Administration had Specification W-H-193 for electric space heaters, it was replaced in 1995 by the UL standards. Additional information on portable-heater safety may be found at the Department of Energy's Energy Efficiency website.

=== Legislation ===
New York City law has safety requirements for space heaters. Any space heater for sale in the city must have a thermostat and a feature to automatically shut off if the heater tips over or overheats, and it must be certified and labeled by a nationally approved organization or laboratory.

== Efficiency ==
The U.S. Environmental Protection Agency has evaluated a number of space heaters, but none have received its Energy Star label.

Electric space heaters are virtually 100% energy efficient, as they convert 100% of electricity into heat energy. However, despite the efficiency, they are typically a less economical method of heating compared to natural gas due to the cost of electricity, or heat pumps which can output equivalent heat with significantly less electricity.

== See also ==
- Central heating
- District heating
- Electric heating
- Radiator
- Solar combisystem
