= Thermostatic valve =

Thermostatic valve may refer to:

- Thermostatic radiator valve
- Thermostatic mixing valve
- Thermal expansion valve
