= Wax motor =

Wax-based linear actuator device

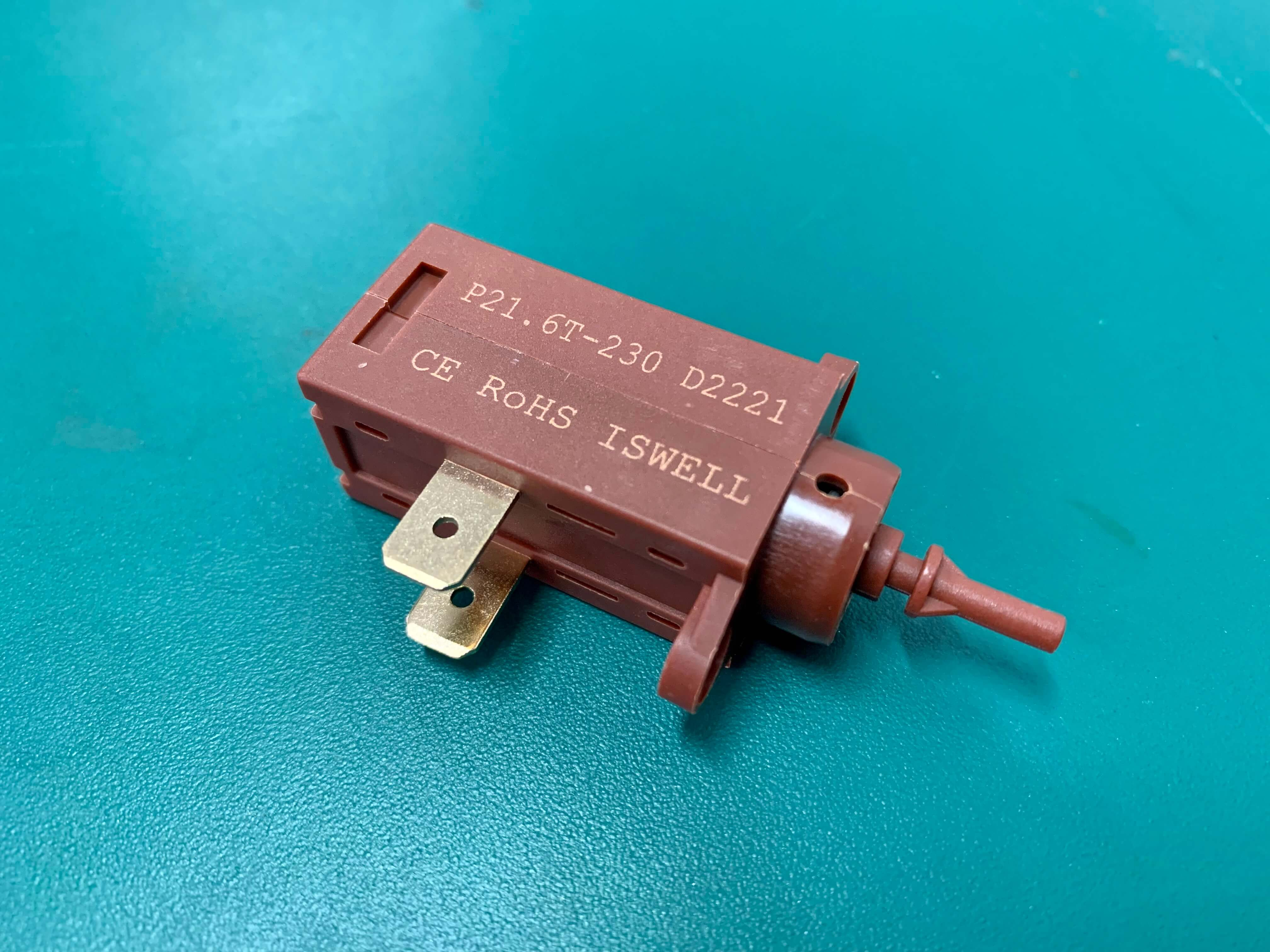
A wax motor manufactured by iSwell

A wax motor is a linear actuator device that converts thermal energy into mechanical energy by exploiting the phase-change behaviour of waxes. During melting, wax typically expands in volume by 5–20%.

A wide range of waxes can be used in wax motors, ranging from highly refined hydrocarbons to waxes extracted from vegetable matter. Specific examples include paraffin waxes in the straight-chain n-alkanes series. These melt and solidify over a well-defined and narrow temperature range.

== Design ==
The principal components of a wax motor are:

- An enclosed volume of wax
- A plunger or stroke-rod to convert the thermo-hydraulic force from the wax into a useful mechanical output
- A source of heat such as:
  - Electric current; typically a PTC thermistor, that heats the wax
  - Solar radiation; e.g. greenhouse vents
  - Combustion heat; e.g. excess heat from internal combustion engines
  - Ambient heat
- A sink to reject heat energy such as:
  - Convection to cooler ambient air
  - Peltier effect device arranged to transfer heat energy away

When the heat source is energized, the wax block is heated and it expands, driving the plunger outwards by volume displacement. When the heat source is removed, the wax block contracts as it cools and the wax solidifies. For the plunger to withdraw, a biasing force is usually required to overcome the mechanical resistance of seals that contain the liquid wax. The biasing force is typically 20% to 30% of the operating force and often provided by a mechanical spring or gravity-fed dead weight applied externally into the wax motor (Duerig 1990, p. 214).

Depending on the particular application, wax motors potentially have advantages over magnetic solenoids:

- They provide a large hydraulic force from the expansion of the wax in the order of 4000 N (corresponding to roughly 400 kg or 900 lb at standard gravity) (Tibbitts 1988, p. 13).
- Both the application and the release of the wax motor is not instantaneous, but rather, smooth and gentle.
- Because the wax motor is a resistive load rather than an inductive load, wax motors controlled by TRIACs do not require snubber circuits.
- Wax motors can be operated entirely passively by exploiting ambient sources of energy. Given that a variety of melting-points are possible for the wax used inside the motor, one can be selected to match the range of ambient operating temperatures in a given application. In this way the wax can be melted and solidified within this range by the transfer of thermal energy. When co-located with the heat source, wax motors can be operated without the need for an additional external power source.

== Applications ==
=== Aerospace Controls ===
Wax motors are used heavily in the aerospace industry where they are utilized to control fuel, hydraulic, and other oils critical to safe flight today in modern airplanes.

=== Mixing Valves - HVAC ===
Wax motors are contained inside "self actuating" thermostatic mixing valves, where the wax motor senses thermal change and responds accordingly to yield a desired mixed fluid temperature.

=== Laundry washing machines ===
Some front load washing machines use wax motors to engage the door lock assembly. When a cycle is started, a wax motor is actuated pushing a pin outward and locking the door. This design has cost, reliability and safety advantages. In moist conditions a wax motor costs less for equivalent reliability than an electromagnetic solenoid or motor latch. It has a predictable passive release delay. If power is lost the door remains briefly locked, designed to be longer than the high speed spin cycle coast-down time, then reliably unlocks as the wax cools.

=== Heating systems ===
Wax motors are also commonly used to drive zone valves in hydronic (hot water) heating systems.

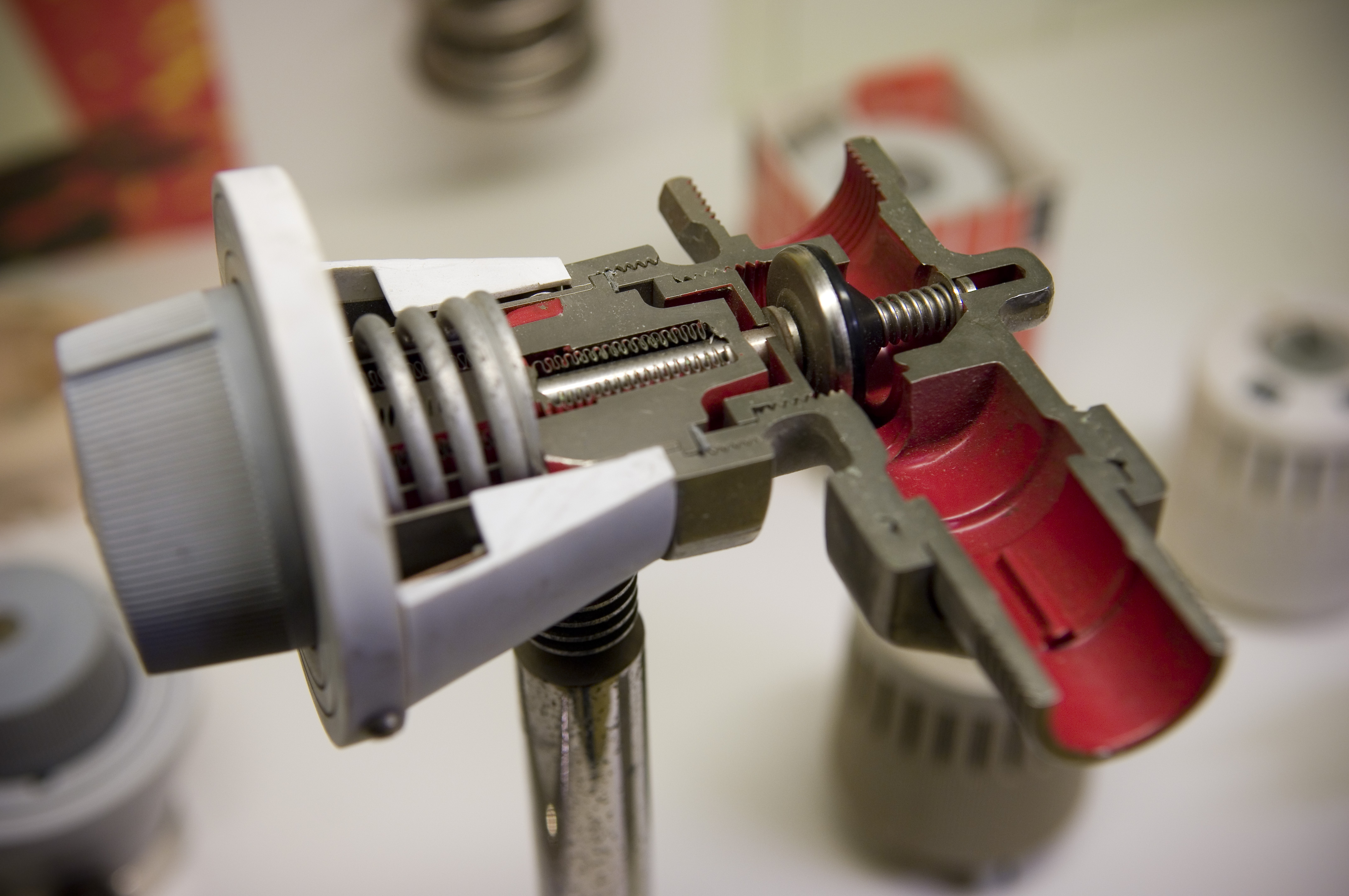
Cutaway model of a thermostatic radiator valve. A wax motor concealed within the spring actuates the water valve at right.

=== Dishwashers ===
They are used in many dishwashers to release the detergent dispenser door latch. The wax motor acts like a solenoid when activated by the dishwasher's timer or control, and the piston operates the mechanism which then releases the catch for the dispenser door. They are also used to control the exhaust vent for the drying cycle.

=== Greenhouse vents ===
Wax motors are widely used to operate the temperature regulating vents of greenhouses.

In this application, as the ambient temperature within the greenhouse increases, the wax melts, activating the plunger and opening the vents. When the greenhouse temperature has cooled sufficiently, the wax cools and solidifies, allowing the vents to close again.

=== Paraffin microactuator ===
A paraffin microactuator is a type of wax motor, often fabricated by microelectromechanical systems (MEMS) technology or sometimes precision mechanics.

== See also ==
- Wax thermostatic element
- Thermostatic radiator valve
