= Aquastat (disambiguation) =

Aquastat is a device used in hydronic heating systems.

Aquastat may refer to:

- Aquastat, a database of global water usage maintained by the United Nations Food and Agriculture Organization

== See also ==
- Aquastar (watch brand)
- Aquastax, a mobile game
