= Hydronic balancing =

Optimization of the distribution of water in a building's heating or cooling system

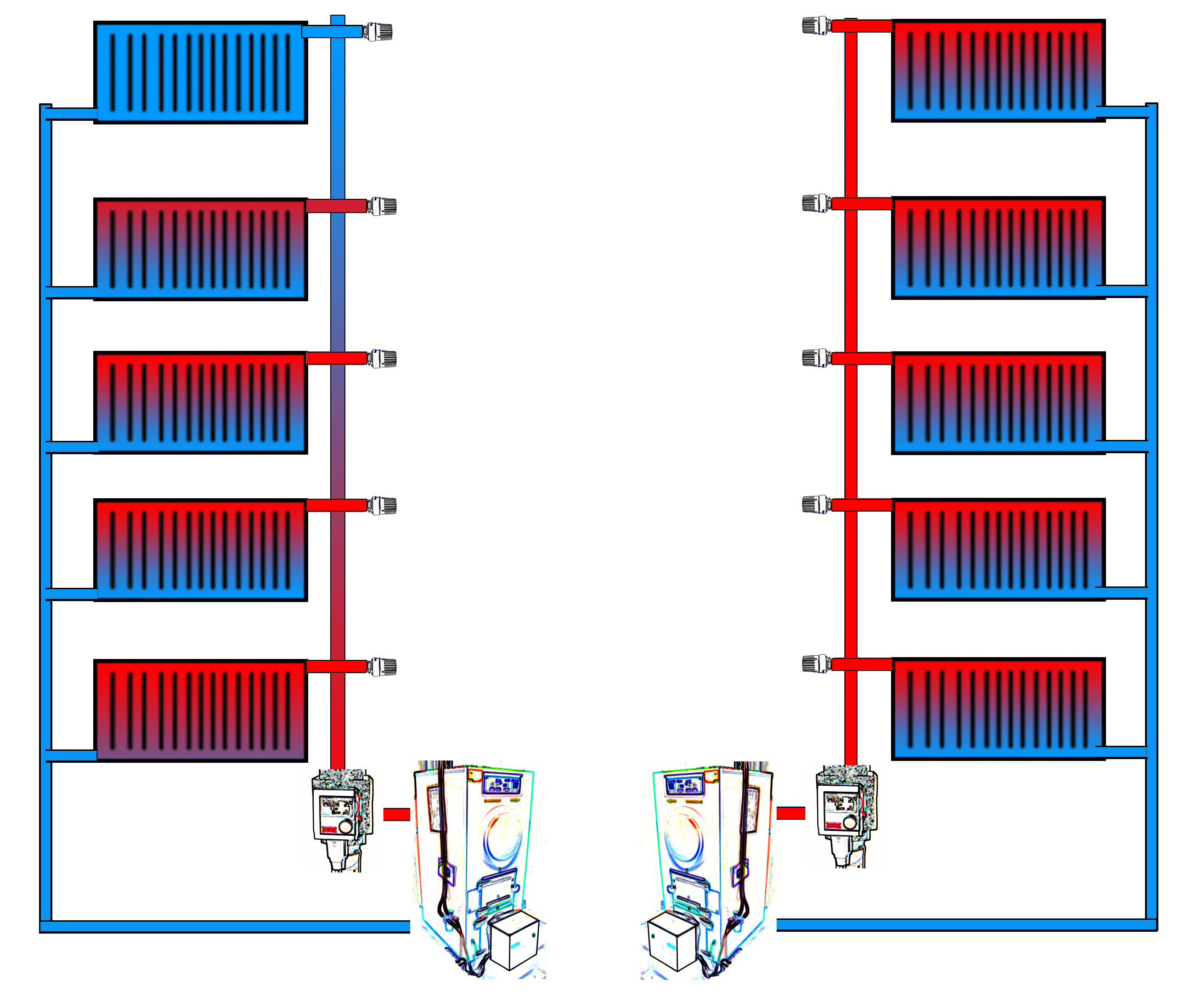
Hydronic balancing

Hydronic balancing, also called hydraulic balancing, is the process of optimizing the distribution of water in a building's hydronic heating or cooling system by equalizing the system pressure. In a balanced system every radiator is set to receive the proper amount of fluid in order to provide the intended indoor climate at optimum energy efficiency and minimal operating cost.

== System imbalances ==
To provide the correct power output, heating or cooling devices require a design flow. Theoretically, it is possible to design plants that deliver the design flow at each terminal unit (heating or cooling device). In reality, this is not possible because pipes and valves only come in certain sizes. Moreover, predicting the real flow in a system is prohibitively complex. Some circuits (typically those closest to the pump) will be favored by higher than required flows at the expense of other circuits that will have underflows.

Control valves may temporarily help by gradually reducing the flow in favoured circuits, thus allowing unfavored circuits to achieve the correct flow. This will, however, cause long delays in reaching the set temperature in the building after night setback and will make the installation very inefficient.

== Balancing ==
Balancing limits the flow in favoured circuits, forcing water through unfavored circuits. As a result, the required design flows are available to all circuits and the system can provide the required indoor air quality. Avoiding overflows means the pump is not doing unnecessary work which saves energy, reduces operating cost and can reduce the size of the pump required (saving on the initial pump investment). Balancing also saves energy and operating costs by reducing the amount of time between starting a plant and reaching the required indoor climate. For example, after every set back unbalanced plants must start earlier and run at maximum capacity for longer than balanced plants thereby using more energy.

In small heating systems (e.g. domestic systems), balancing is quite easy because of the small number of terminal units and relatively simple distribution network. Balancing can normally be achieved by simply pre-setting the flow through the radiators.

Larger buildings, such as offices or hospitals, have more complicated heating and cooling systems and require a more accurate balancing technique. To obtain a plant with the correct design flows, consultants design systems to include balancing valves, differential pressure controllers or pressure independent control valves.

== Mechanisms ==
Balancing valves allow the measurement of differential pressures, which can be used to calculate a flow. There are various balancing methods, but all involve measuring differential pressures and adjusting them to the correct value by calculating the flow which each one represents.

Differential pressure controllers are usually membrane- or spring-driven valves that control the differential pressures in the installation. This simplifies balancing procedures and enables the installation to be more precisely controlled.

Pressure-independent valves combine the balancing and control functions in one valve and use springs or membranes to precisely control the flows in the distribution network. As such they need no measuring or balancing procedure.

== See also ==
- Hydronics
- Hydraulics
