= Tap water =

Water supplied through a pipe and tap combination

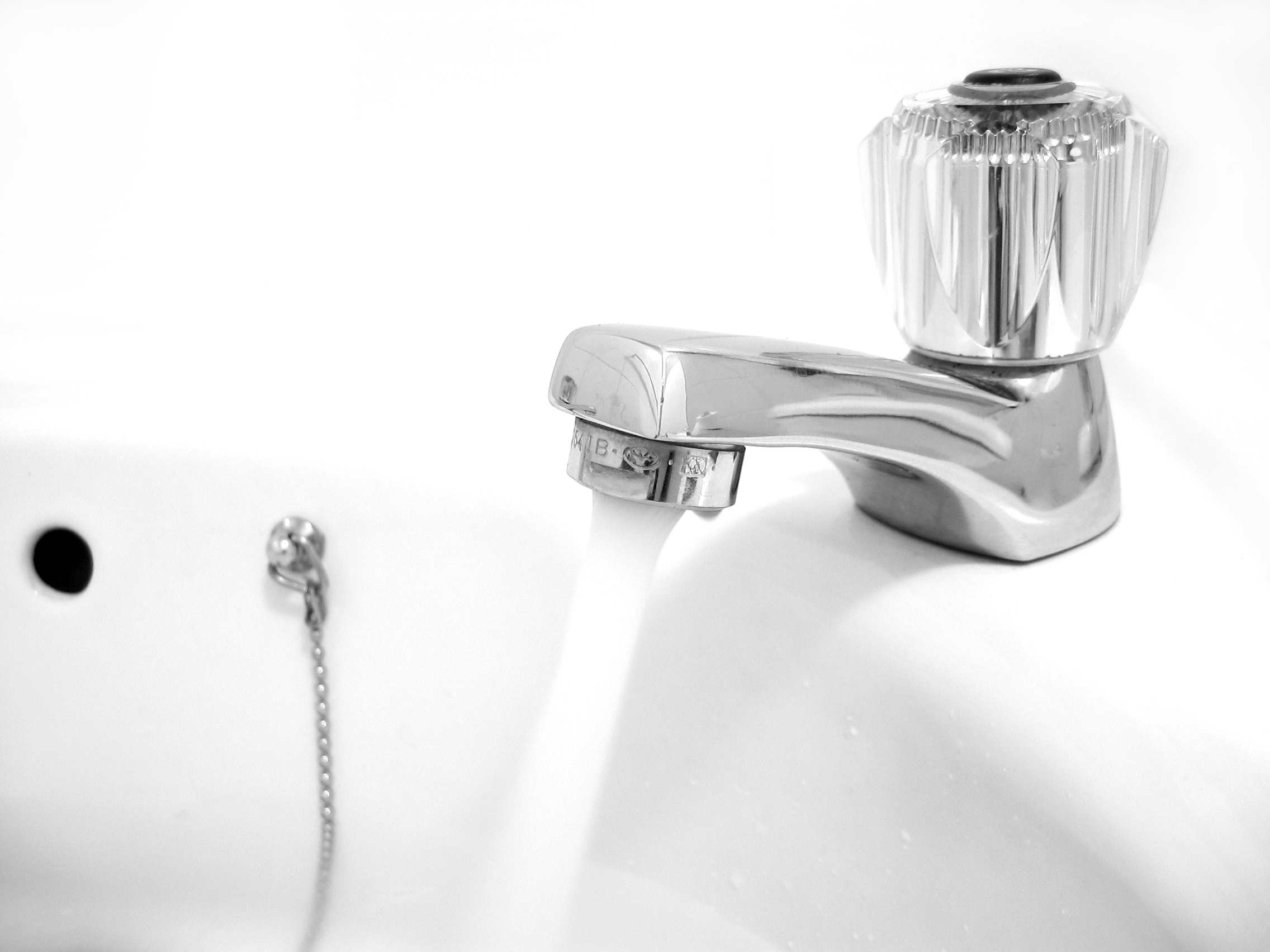
Indoor water tap on a ceramic hand wash basin

Tap water (also known as running water, piped water or municipal water) is water supplied through a tap, a water dispenser valve. In many countries, tap water usually has the quality of drinking water. Tap water is commonly used for drinking, cooking, and washing. Indoor tap water is distributed through indoor plumbing, which has been around since antiquity but was available to very few people until the second half of the 19th century when it began to spread in popularity in what are now developed countries. Tap water became common in many regions during the 20th century, and is now lacking mainly among people in poverty, especially in developing countries.

Governmental agencies commonly regulate tap water quality. Calling a water supply "tap water" distinguishes it from the other main types of fresh water which may be available; these include water from rainwater-collecting cisterns, water from village pumps or town pumps, water from wells, or water carried from streams, rivers, or lakes (whose potability may vary).

== Terminology ==
A synonym for tap water is piped water, a term used by the Joint Monitoring Programme (JMP) for Water Supply and Sanitation by WHO and UNICEF to describe the situation for access to drinking water in developing countries. Piped water is not necessarily of drinking water quality but does count as an "improved water source" in the logic of Sustainable Development Goal 6. Other improved water sources include boreholes, protected dug wells or springs, rainwater, and bottled or water delivered by tanker.

== Fixtures and appliances ==
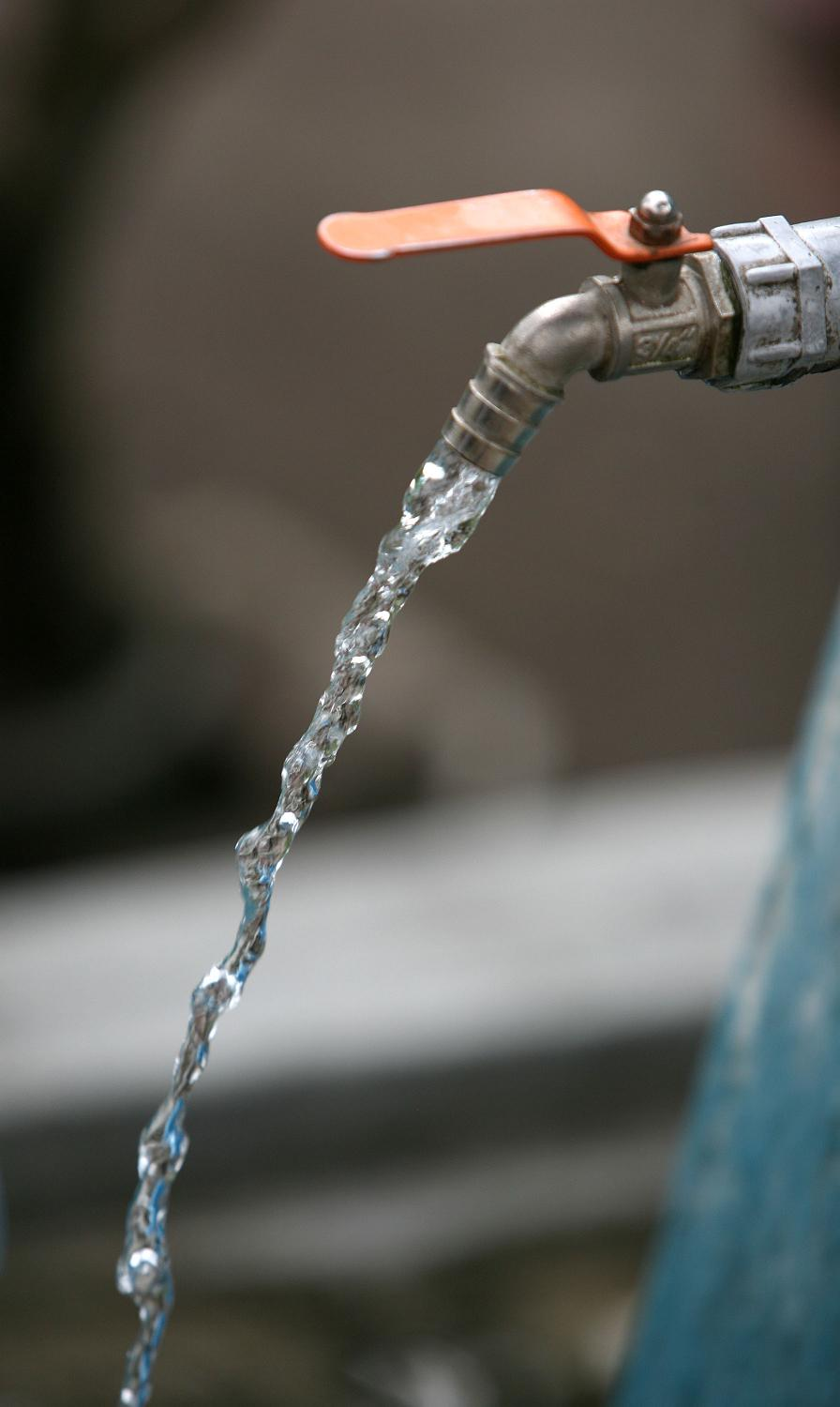
An outdoor drinking water tap at Desa Dasan Geria Village, West Lombok

Everything in a building that uses water falls under one of two categories; fixture or appliance. As the consumption points above perform their function, most produce waste/sewage components that will require removal by the waste/sewage side of the system. The minimum is an air gap. See cross connection control & backflow prevention for an overview of backflow prevention methods and devices currently in use, both through the use of mechanical and physical principles.

Fixtures are devices that use water without an additional source of power.

=== Fittings and valves ===
Potable water supply systems are composed of pipes, fittings, and valves.

==== Water flow reduction ====
Water flow through a tap can be reduced by inexpensive small plastic flow reducers. These restrict flow between 15 and 50%, aiding water conservation and reducing the burden on both water supply and treatment facilities.

=== Materials ===
The installation of water pipes can be done using the following plastic and metal materials:

==== Plastic ====
- polybutylene (PB)
- high density cross-linked polyethylene (PE-X)
- block copolymer of polypropylene (PP-B)
- the polypropylene copolymer (PP-H)
- random copolymer of polypropylene (random) (PP-R)
- Layer: cross-linked polyethylene, aluminum, high-density polyethylene (PE-X / Al / PE-HD)
- Layer: polyethylene crosslinked, aluminum, cross-linked polyethylene (PE-X / Al / PE-X)
- Layer copolymer of a random polypropylene, aluminum, polypropylene random copolymer (PP-R / Al / PP-R)
- polyvinyl chloride, chlorinated (PVC-C)
- polyvinyl chloride - not softened(only cold water) (PVC-U)

==== Metals ====
- carbon steel, ordinary galvanized
- corrosion resistant steel
- Deoxidized High Phosphorus copper (Cu-DHP)
- lead (no longer used for new installations due to its toxicity)

Other materials, if the pipes made from them have been let into circulation and the widespread use in the construction of the water supply systems.

==== Lead pipes ====
For many centuries, water pipes were made of lead, because of its ease of processing and durability. The use of lead pipes was a cause of health problems due to ignorance of the dangers of lead on the human body, which causes miscarriages and high death rates of newborns. Lead pipes, which were installed mostly in the late 1800s in the US, are still common today, much of which are located in the Northeast and the Midwest. Their impact is relatively small due to the fouling of pipes and stone cessation of the evolution of lead in the water; however, lead pipes are still detrimental. Most of the lead pipes that exist today are being removed and replaced with the more common material, copper or some type of plastic.

== Distribution systems and contamination ==
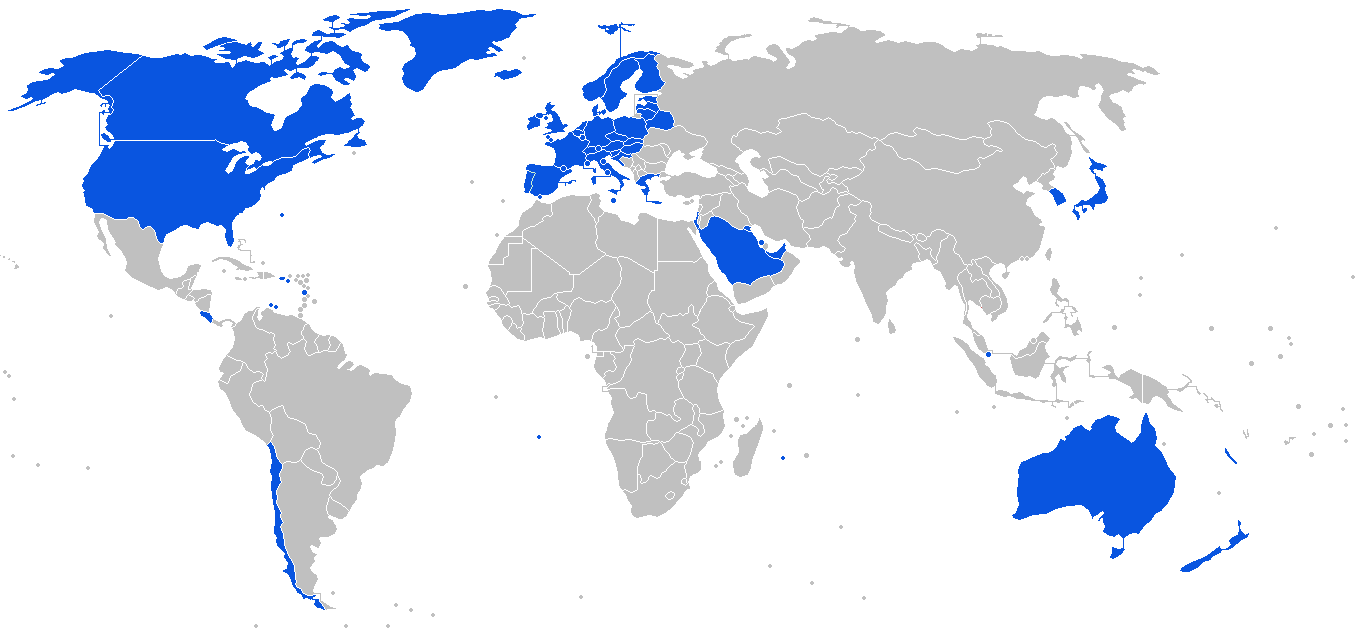
Countries where tap water is generally safe to drink

Modern plumbing delivers clean, safe, and potable water to each service point in water distribution system, including taps. It is important that the clean water not be contaminated by the wastewater (disposal) side of the process system. Historically, this contamination of drinking water has been one of the largest sources of human fatalities.

Most of the mandates for enforcing drinking water quality standards are not for the distribution system, but for the treatment plant. Even though the water distribution system is supposed to deliver the treated water to the consumers' taps without water quality degradation, complicated physical, chemical, and biological factors within the system can cause contamination of tap water. If fecal indicator bacteria are found, it indicates that the water source may have been contaminated with fecal matter and requires treatment. The movement of water to consumers may require several hours or even days, leading to what is known as “water age.” This age represents the system’s hydraulic retention time, variations in water consumption, and the size and complexity of the distribution network.

Tap water can sometimes appear cloudy and is often mistaken for mineral impurities in the water. It is usually caused by air bubbles coming out of solution due to change in temperature or pressure. Because cold water holds more air than warm water, small bubbles will appear in water. It has a high dissolved gas content that is heated or depressurized, which reduces how much dissolved gas the water can hold. The harmless cloudiness of the water disappears quickly as the gas is released from the water.

== Water supply ==
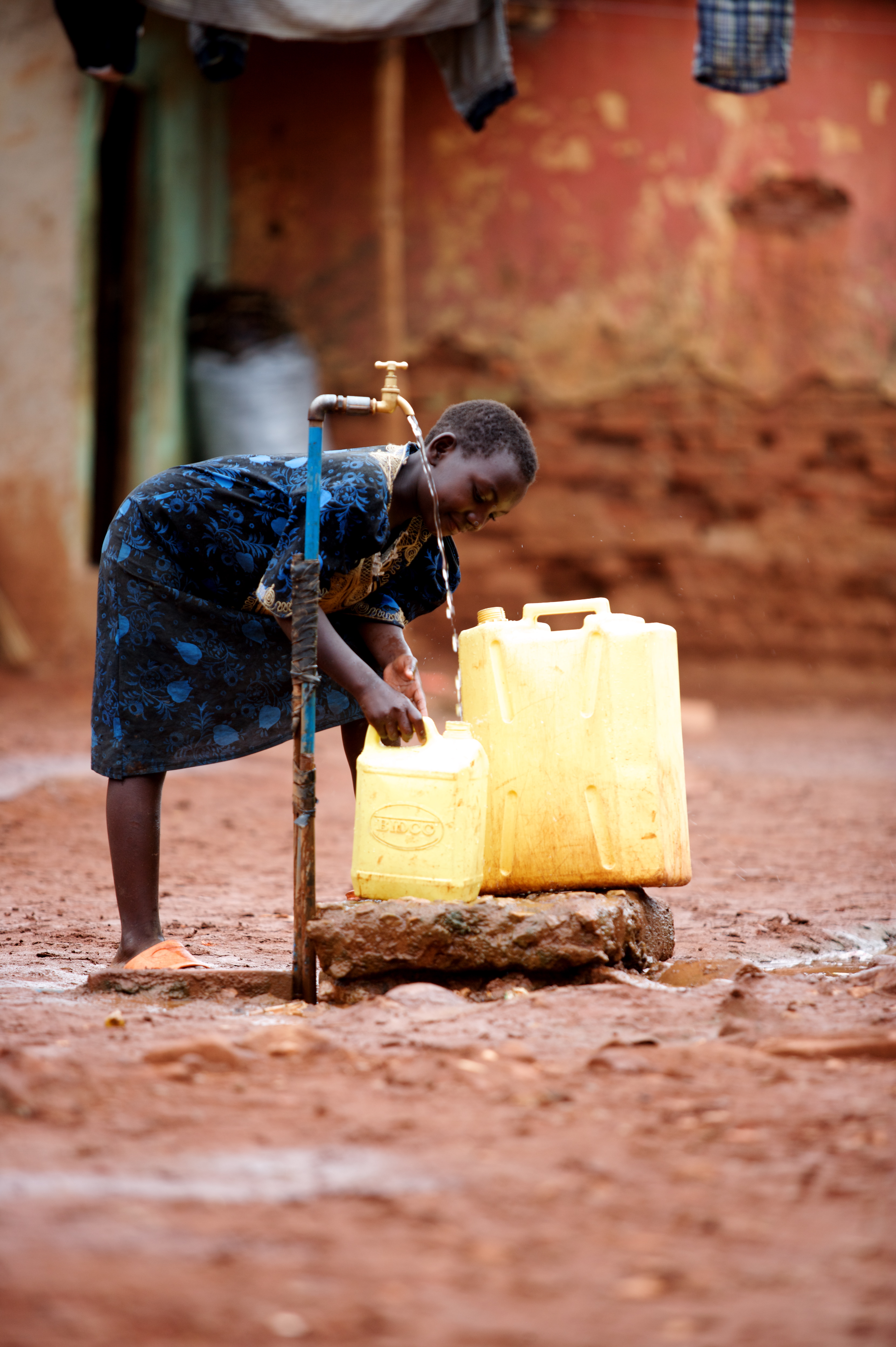
A girl collects clean water from a communal water supply in Kawempe, Uganda.

Water supply is the provision of water by public utilities, commercial organisations, community endeavors or by individuals, usually via a system of pumps and pipes. Public water supply systems are crucial to properly functioning societies. These systems are what supply drinking water to populations around the globe. Aspects of service quality include continuity of supply, water quality and water pressure. The institutional responsibility for water supply is arranged differently in different countries and regions (urban versus rural). It usually includes issues surrounding policy and regulation, service provision and standardization.

The cost of supplying water consists, to a very large extent, of fixed costs (capital costs and personnel costs) and only to a small extent of variable costs that depend on the amount of water consumed (mainly energy and chemicals). Almost all service providers in the world charge tariffs to recover part of their costs.

== Comparison to bottled water ==
Tap water is one of the most rigorously tested and monitored products in developed countries and it is very safe to drink. Bottled water may have reduced amounts of copper, lead, and other metal contaminants since it does not run through the plumbing pipes where tap water is exposed to metal corrosion; however, this varies by the household and plumbing system.

In much of the developed world, chlorine often is added as a disinfectant to tap water. If the water contains organic matter, this may produce other byproducts in the water such as trihalomethanes and haloacetic acids, which has shown to increase the risk of cancer. The level of residual chlorine found at around 0.0002 g per litre, which is too small to cause any health problems directly. The chlorine concentration recommended by World Health Organization is between 0.0002 and 0.0005 g/L.

The documentary Tapped argues against the bottled water industry, asserting that tap water is healthier, more environmentally sustainable, and more ecologically sound than bottled water. The film focuses on the bottled water industry in the United States. The film has received largely positive reviews, and has spawned college campus groups such as "Beyond the Bottle". Yet, as many people remain generally unaware of the negative health and environmental impacts associated with bottled water, recent research in environmental psychology has started to investigate how to reduce the public's consumption of bottled water.

Preferences for tap versus bottled water are mostly guided by taste, perceived safety, and personal habits. Negative sensory traits in tap water—such as bad taste or odor—encourages higher bottled water consumption. Plastic bottled water consumption has continued to rise, even in regions with high-quality tap water. This growth contributes to environmental issues such as transportation emissions and buildup of non-degradable plastics.

=== United States ===
Contaminant levels found in tap water vary between households and plumbing systems. While the majority of US households have access to high-quality tap water, demand for bottled water increases. In 2002, the Gallup Public Opinion Poll revealed that the possible health risk associated with tap water consumption is one of the main reasons that cause American consumers to prefer bottled water over tap water.

The trust level towards tap water depends on various criteria, including the existing governmental regulations towards the water quality and their appliance. In 1993, a cryptosporidiosis outbreak in Milwaukee, Wisconsin affected more than 400,000 residents and was considered the largest in US history. Severe violations of tap water standards influence the decrease in public trust.

The difference in water quality between bottled and tap water is debatable. In 1999, the Natural Resources Defense Council (NRDC) released controversial findings from a 4-year study on bottled water. The study claimed that one-third of the tested waters were contaminated with synthetic organic chemicals, bacteria, and arsenic. At least one sample exceeded state guidelines for contamination levels in bottled water.

In the United States, some municipalities make an effort to use tap water over bottled water on governmental properties and events. Voters in Washington State repealed a bottled water tax via citizen initiative.

== See also ==
- ASTM B75-02 Specification for Seamless Copper Tube, B42-02e1 Standard Specification for Seamless Copper Pipe, Standard Sizes, B88-03 Standard Specification for Seamless Copper Water Tube
- Automatic balancing valves – Component of central heating and cooling systems
- Fountain – Architecture which pours water into a basin or jets it into the air
- Pipe support – Element that transfers loads from a pipe to supporting structures
- Plumbing – Systems for conveying fluids
- Water fluoridation – Addition of fluoride to a water supply to reduce tooth decay
- Water supply – Provision of water by public utilities, commercial organisations or others
- Water pipe – Systems for conveying fluids
