= Baseboard (disambiguation) =

Baseboard can refer to:

- Baseboard - a type of wooden, plastic, MDF or Styrofoam trim installed along the bottom of a wall
- Motherboard - a computer component
- Base board - a type of heater, see Hydronics
- Base board - the wooden board that scenery and track is attached to in Rail transport modelling
