= Zone valve =

Type of water- of steam-flow valve

A zone valve is a specific type of valve used to control the flow of water or steam in a hydronic heating or cooling system.

In the interest of improving efficiency and occupant comfort, such systems are commonly divided up into multiple zones. For example, in a house, the main floor may be served by one heating zone while the upstairs bedrooms are served by another. In this way, the heat can be directed principally to the main floor during the day and principally to the bedrooms at night, allowing the unoccupied areas to cool down.

This zoning can be accomplished in one of two ways:

- Multiple circulator pumps, or
- A single circulator pump and zone valves.

== Zone valve construction and operation ==
Zone valves as used in home hydronic systems are usually electrically powered. In large commercial installations, vacuum or compressed air may be used instead. In either case, the motor is usually connected to the water valve via a mechanical coupling.

For electrical zone valves, the motor is often a small shaded-pole synchronous motor combined with a rotary switch that can disconnect the motor at either of the two stopping points ("valve open" or "valve closed"). In this way, applying power to the "open valve" terminal causes the motor to run until the valve is open while applying power at the "close valve" terminal causes the motor to run until the valve is closed. The motor is commonly powered from the same 24 volt ac power source that is used for the rest of the control system. This allows the zone valves to be directly controlled by low-voltage thermostats and wired with low-voltage wiring. This style of valve requires the use of an SPDT thermostat or relay.

A simpler variant of the motorized design omits the switch that detects the valve position. The motor is simply driven until the valve hits a mechanical stop, which stalls the motor. In an alternative design, the motor continues to turn, while a slip clutch allows the valve to be pushed against a mechanical stop. Usually, the valve remains open as long as power is supplied, and a strong spring closes it when power is cut. This simpler design consumes electrical power whenever the valve is open. There is no feedback to verify the state of the valve, which is assumed to do what has been commanded.

Zone valves can also be constructed using wax motors and a spring-return mechanism. In this case, the valve is normally closed by the force of the spring but can be opened by the force of the wax motor. Removal of electrical power re-closes the valve. This style of zone valve operates with a perfectly ordinary SPST thermostat.

For vacuum- or pneumatically operated zone valves, the thermostat usually switches the pressure or vacuum on or off, causing a spring-loaded rubber diaphragm or ball valve to move and actuate the valve. Unlike the switch-monitored electrical zone valves, these valves automatically return to the default position without the application of any power, and the default position is usually "open", allowing heat to flow.

Highly sophisticated systems may use some form of building automation such as BACnet or LonWorks to control the zone valves.

== Comparison with multiple circulator pumps ==
Multiple zones can be implemented using either multiple, individually controlled circulator pumps or a single pump and multiple zone valves. Each approach has advantages and disadvantages.

=== Multiple pump system ===
Advantages:

- Lower total cost of ownership when zone valve failure and repair costs are taken into account.
- More robust and reliable system.
- Simple mechanical and control design ("SPST thermostats")
- Redundancy: If one zone pump fails, the others can remain working
- Far superior method of linking multiple heat sources. Such as gas and solid fuel in one system.

Disadvantages:

- Higher initial installation cost. Circulator pumps cost more than zone valves
- Higher power consumption. Operating circulators draw more power any time the zone is actively heating. Zone valves, by comparison, draw little power at any time and many designs only draw power while in transition from open to close or vice versa.

=== Zone valve system ===
Advantages:

- Lower initial installation cost.
- Lower power consumption.
- Ease of maintenance certain models.

Disadvantages:

- Zone valves operated by electric timing motors aren't "fail safe" (failing to the "open" condition).
- No inherent redundancy for the pump. A zone-valved system is dependent upon a single circulator pump. If it fails, the system becomes completely inoperable.
- The system can be harder to design, requiring both "SPDT" thermostats or relays and the ability of the system to withstand the fault condition whereby all zone valves are closed simultaneously.
- Zone valves increase the pressure drop through the system, to varying degrees. Care is required during system design to achieve proper flow rates with zone valves.

== Selected manufacturers ==
- Honeywell
- Siemens

== See also ==
- Zone damper
