= Paraffin wax =

Soft colorless solid derived from petroleum, coal or shale oil

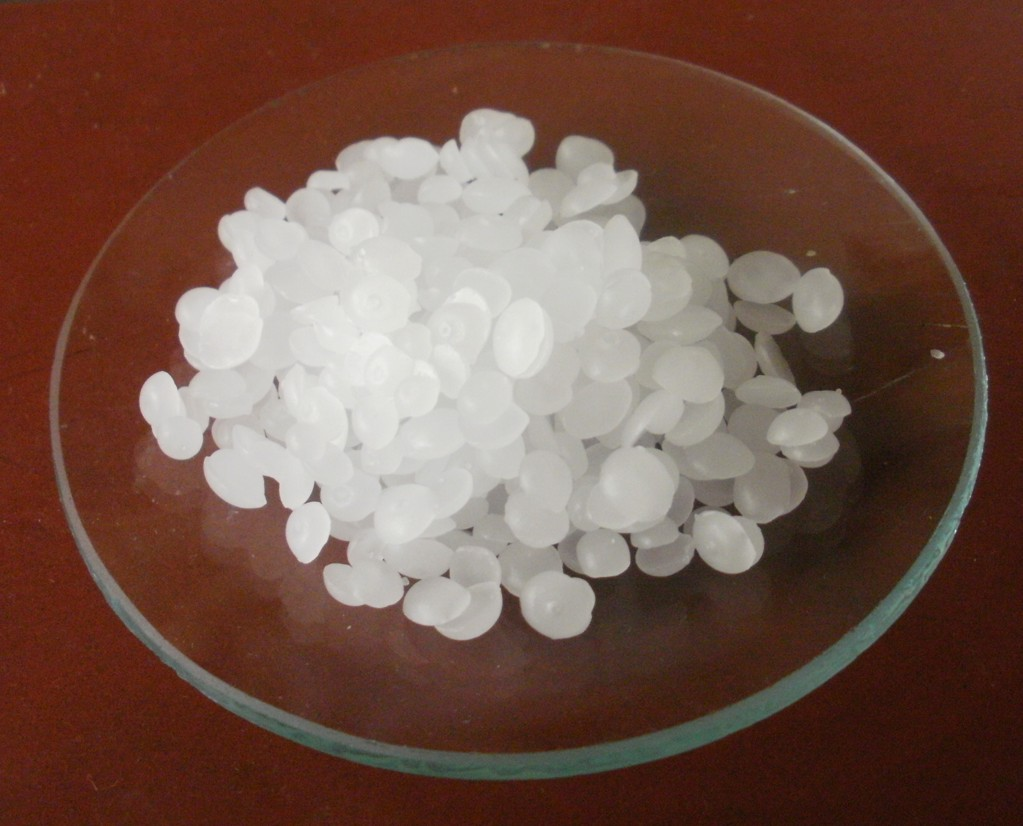

Identifiers
CAS Number	8002-74-2
E number	E905 (glazing agents, ...)
UNII	I9O0E3H2ZE
CompTox Dashboard (EPA)	DTXSID7027673

Properties
Chemical formula	C_{n}H_{2n+2}
Appearance	White solid
Odor	Odorless
Boiling point	> 370 °C (698 °F)
Solubility in water	~1 mg/L

Hazards
Flash point	200–240 °C (392–464 °F; 473–513 K)
- Except where otherwise noted, data are given for materials in their standard state (at 25 °C [77 °F], 100 kPa). Infobox references

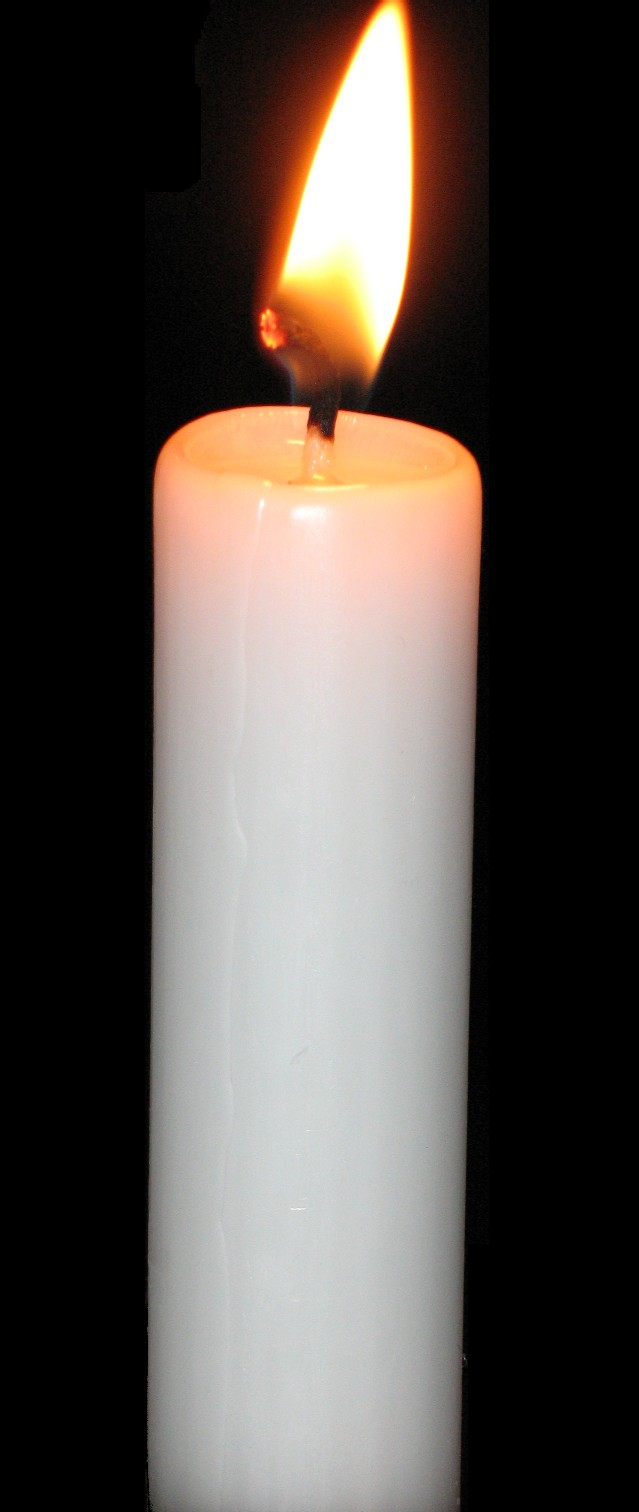
Paraffin candle

Paraffin wax (or petroleum wax) is a soft colorless solid derived from petroleum, coal, or oil shale that consists of a mixture of hydrocarbon molecules containing between 20 and 40 carbon atoms. It is solid at room temperature and begins to melt above approximately 37 °C (99 °F), and its boiling point is above 370 °C (698 °F). Common applications for paraffin wax include lubrication, electrical insulation, and candles; dyed paraffin wax can be made into crayons.

Un-dyed, unscented paraffin candles are odorless and bluish-white. Paraffin wax was first created by Carl Reichenbach in Germany in 1830 and marked a major advancement in candlemaking technology, as it burned more cleanly and reliably than tallow candles and was cheaper to produce.

In chemistry, paraffin is used synonymously with alkane, indicating hydrocarbons with the general formula C_{n}H_{2n+2}. The name is derived from Latin parum ("very little") + affinis, meaning "lacking affinity" or "lacking reactivity", referring to paraffin's unreactive nature.

== Properties ==
Paraffin wax is mostly found as a white, odorless, flavourless, waxy solid, with a typical melting point between about 46 and 68 °C (115 and 154 °F), and a density of around 900 kg/m^{3}. It is insoluble in water, but soluble in ether, benzene, and certain esters. Paraffin is unaffected by most common chemical reagents but burns readily. Its heat of combustion is 42 MJ/kg.

The hydrocarbon C_{31}H_{64} is a typical component of paraffin wax.

Paraffin wax is an excellent electrical insulator, with a resistivity of between 10^{13} and 10^{17} ohm-metre. This is better than nearly all other materials except some plastics (notably PTFE). It is an effective neutron moderator and was used in James Chadwick's 1932 experiments to identify the neutron.

Paraffin wax is an excellent material for storing heat, with a specific heat capacity of 2.14–2.9 J⋅g^{−1}⋅K^{−1} (joules per gram per kelvin) and a heat of fusion of 200–220 J⋅g^{−1}. Paraffin wax phase-change cooling coupled with retractable radiators was used to cool the electronics of the Lunar Roving Vehicle during the crewed missions to the Moon in the early 1970s. Wax expands considerably when it melts and so is used in wax element thermostats for industrial, domestic and, particularly, automobile purposes.

If pure paraffin wax is heated in a partially open glass vessel until it nears the flash point and then rapidly cooled, its vapors may autoignite as result of reaching boiling liquid pressure.

== History ==
Paraffin wax was first created in 1830 by German chemist Carl Reichenbach when he attempted to develop a method to efficiently separate and refine waxy substances naturally occurring in petroleum. Paraffin represented a major advance in the candle-making industry because it burned cleanly and was cheaper to manufacture than other candle fuels such as beeswax and tallow. Paraffin wax initially suffered from a low melting point. This was remedied by adding stearic acid. The production of paraffin wax enjoyed a boom in the early 20th century due to the growth of the oil and meatpacking industries, which created paraffin and stearic acid as byproducts.

== Manufacturing ==
The feedstock for paraffin is slack wax, which is a mixture of oil and wax, a byproduct from the refining of lubricating oil.

The first step in making paraffin wax is to remove the oil (de-oiling or de-waxing) from the slack wax. The oil is separated by crystallization. Most commonly, the slack wax is heated, mixed with one or more solvents such as a ketone and then cooled. As it cools, wax crystallizes out of the solution, leaving only oil. This mixture is filtered into two streams: solid (wax plus some solvent) and liquid (oil and solvent). After the solvent is recovered by distillation, the resulting products are called "product wax" (or "press wax") and "foots oil". The lower the percentage of oil in the wax, the more refined it is considered to be (semi-refined versus fully refined). The product wax may be further processed to remove colors and odors. The wax may finally be blended together to give certain desired properties such as melt point and penetration. Paraffin wax is sold in either liquid or solid form.

== Applications ==
In industrial applications, it is often useful to modify the crystal properties of the paraffin wax, typically by adding branching to the existing carbon backbone chain. The modification is usually done with additives, such as EVA copolymers, microcrystalline wax, or forms of polyethylene. The branched properties result in a modified paraffin with a higher viscosity, smaller crystalline structure, and modified functional properties. Pure paraffin wax is rarely used for carving original models for casting metal and other materials in the lost wax process, as it is relatively brittle at room temperature and presents the risks of chipping and breakage when worked. Soft and pliable waxes, like beeswax, may be preferred for such sculpture, but "investment casting waxes", often paraffin-based, are expressly formulated for the purpose.

In a histology or pathology laboratory, paraffin wax is used to impregnate tissue prior to sectioning thin samples. Water is removed from the tissue through ascending strengths of alcohol (75% to absolute), and then the alcohol is cleared in an organic solvent such as xylene. The tissue is then placed in paraffin wax for several hours, then set in a mold with wax to cool and solidify. Sections are then cut on a microtome.

=== Other uses ===
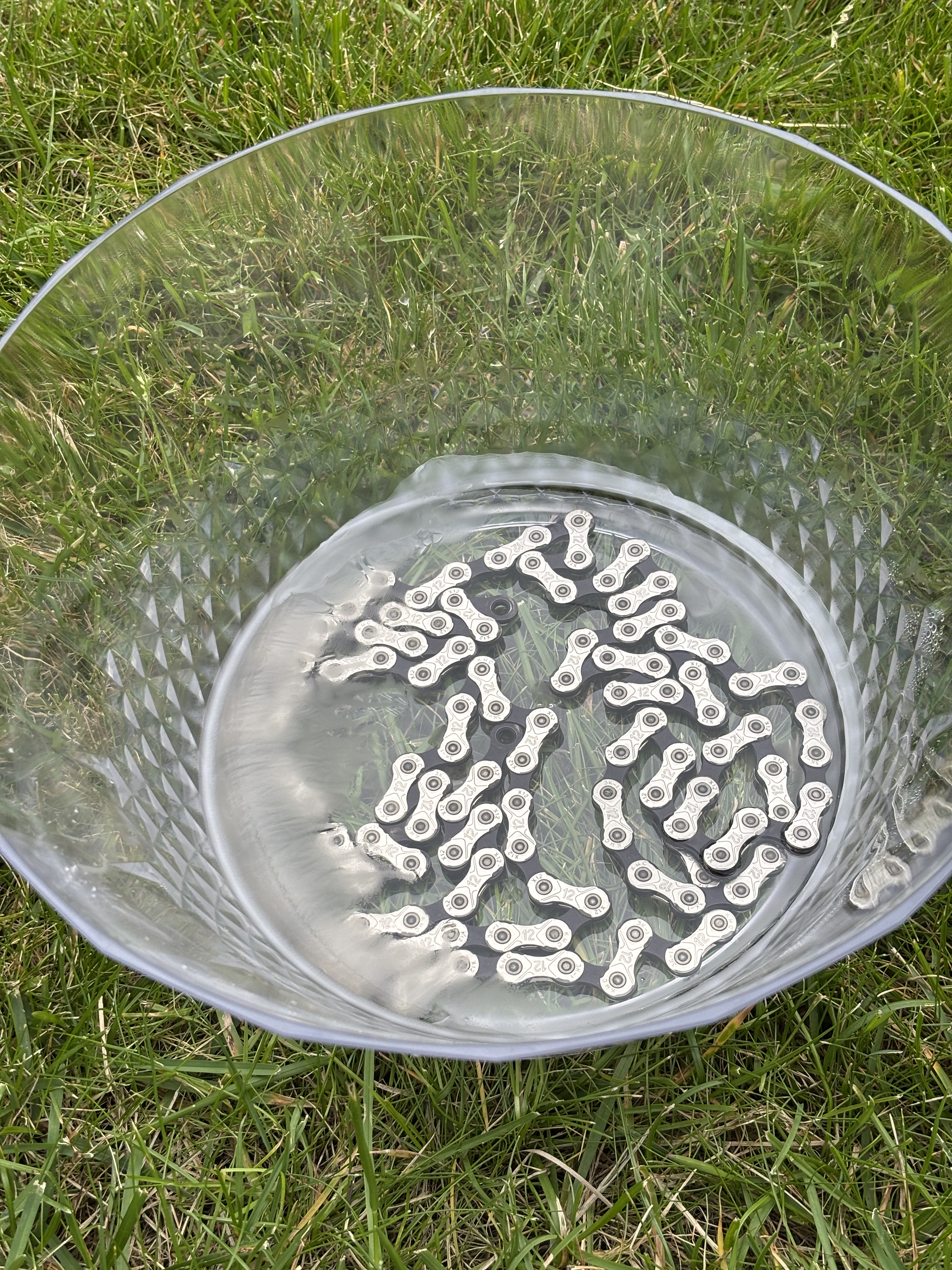
Bicycle chain laying in melted pure paraffin wax without additives, which has gained popularity as a bicycle chain lubrication since around 2020

- Anti-caking agent, moisture repellent, and dustbinding coatings for fertilizers
- Antiozonant agents: blends of paraffin and micro waxes are used in rubber compounds to prevent cracking of the rubber; the admixture of wax migrates to the surface of the product and forms a protective layer. The layer can also act as a release agent, helping the product separate from its mould.
- Bicycle chain lubrication
- Bullet lubricant – with other ingredients, such as olive oil and beeswax
- Candle-making
- Coatings for waxed paper or waxed cotton
- Component of surfboard wax, ski wax, and skateboard wax
- Crayons
- Food-grade paraffin wax:
  - Shiny coating used in candy-making; although edible, it is nondigestible, passing through the body without being broken down
  - Coating for many kinds of hard cheese, like Edam cheese
  - Sealant for jars, cans, and bottles
  - Chewing gum additive
- Forensic investigations: the nitrate test uses paraffin wax to detect nitrates and nitrites on the hand of a shooting suspect
- Fuel for fire breathing
- Investment casting
- Lava lamps
- Manufacture of boiled leather armor and books
- Mechanical thermostats and actuators, as an expansion medium for activating such devices
- Microwax: food additive, a glazing agent with E number E905
- Moisturiser in toiletries and cosmetics such as Vaseline.
- Neutron radiation shielding
- Phase change material for thermal energy storage
  - Used by MESSENGER (Mercury spacecraft), when the spacecraft was unable to radiate excessive heat.
- Phlegmatizing agent, commonly used to stabilise/desensitize high explosives such as RDX
- Potting material to encapsulate electronic components such as guitar pickups, transformers, and inductors, to prevent moisture ingress and to reduce electromagnetically induced acoustic noise and microphonic effects
- Prevents oxidation on the surface of polished steel and iron
- Solid ink color blocks of wax for thermal printers. The wax is melted and then sprayed on the paper producing images with a shiny surface
- Solid propellant for hybrid rocket motors
- Textile manufacturing processes, such as that used for Eisengarn thread
- Thickening agent in many paintballs
- Wax baths for occupational and physical therapies and cosmetic treatments
- Wax carving
- Wood finishing

== Occupational safety ==
People can be exposed to paraffin in the workplace by breathing it in, skin contact, and eye contact. The National Institute for Occupational Safety and Health (NIOSH) has set a recommended exposure limit (REL) for paraffin wax fume exposure of 2 mg/m^{3} over an 8-hour workday.

== See also ==
- Oligomer
- Ozokerite
