= Circulator pump =

Pump for circulating fluid around a closed circuit for hydronic purposes

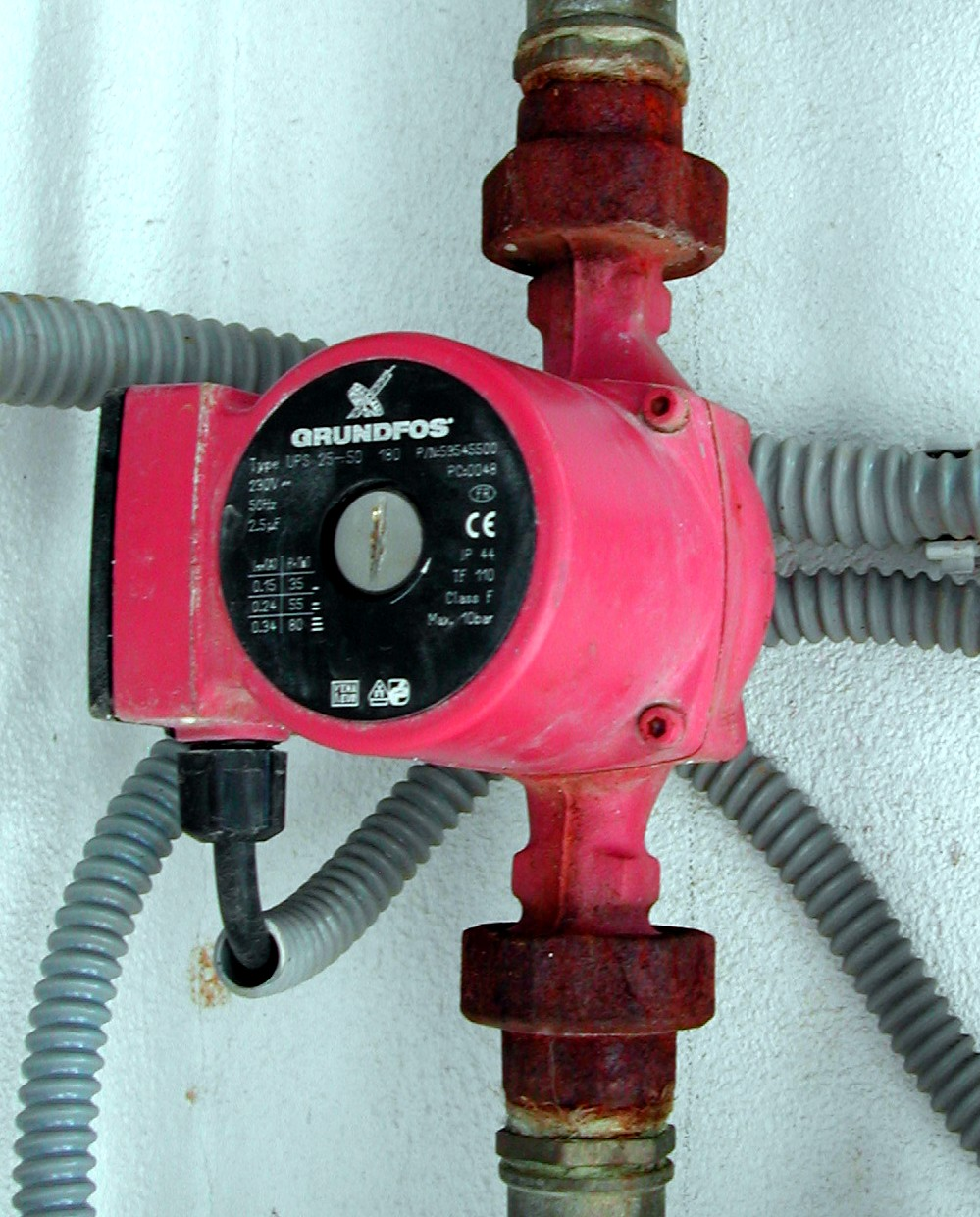
A circulator pump for home use

A circulator pump or circulating pump is a specific type of pump used to circulate gases, liquids, or slurries in a closed circuit with small elevation changes. They are commonly found circulating water in a hydronic heating or cooling system. They are specialized in providing a large flow rate rather than providing much head, as they are supposed to only overcome the friction of a piping system, as opposed to a regular centrifugal pump which may need to lift a fluid significantly.

Circulator pumps as used in hydronic systems are usually electrically powered centrifugal pumps. As used in homes, they are often small, sealed, and rated at a fraction of a horsepower, but in commercial applications they range in size up to many horsepower and the electric motor is usually separated from the pump body by some form of mechanical coupling. The sealed units used in home applications often have the motor rotor, pump impeller, and support bearings combined and sealed within the water circuit. This avoids one of the principal challenges faced by the larger, two-part pumps: maintaining a water-tight seal at the point where the pump drive shaft enters the pump body.

Small- to medium-sized circulator pumps are usually supported entirely by the pipe flanges that join them to the rest of the hydronic plumbing. Large pumps are typically pad-mounted.

Pumps that are used solely for closed hydronic systems can be made with cast iron components as the water in the loop will either become de-oxygenated or be treated with chemicals to inhibit corrosion. However, pumps that have a steady stream of oxygenated, potable water flowing through them must be made of more expensive materials such as bronze.

== Use with domestic hot water ==
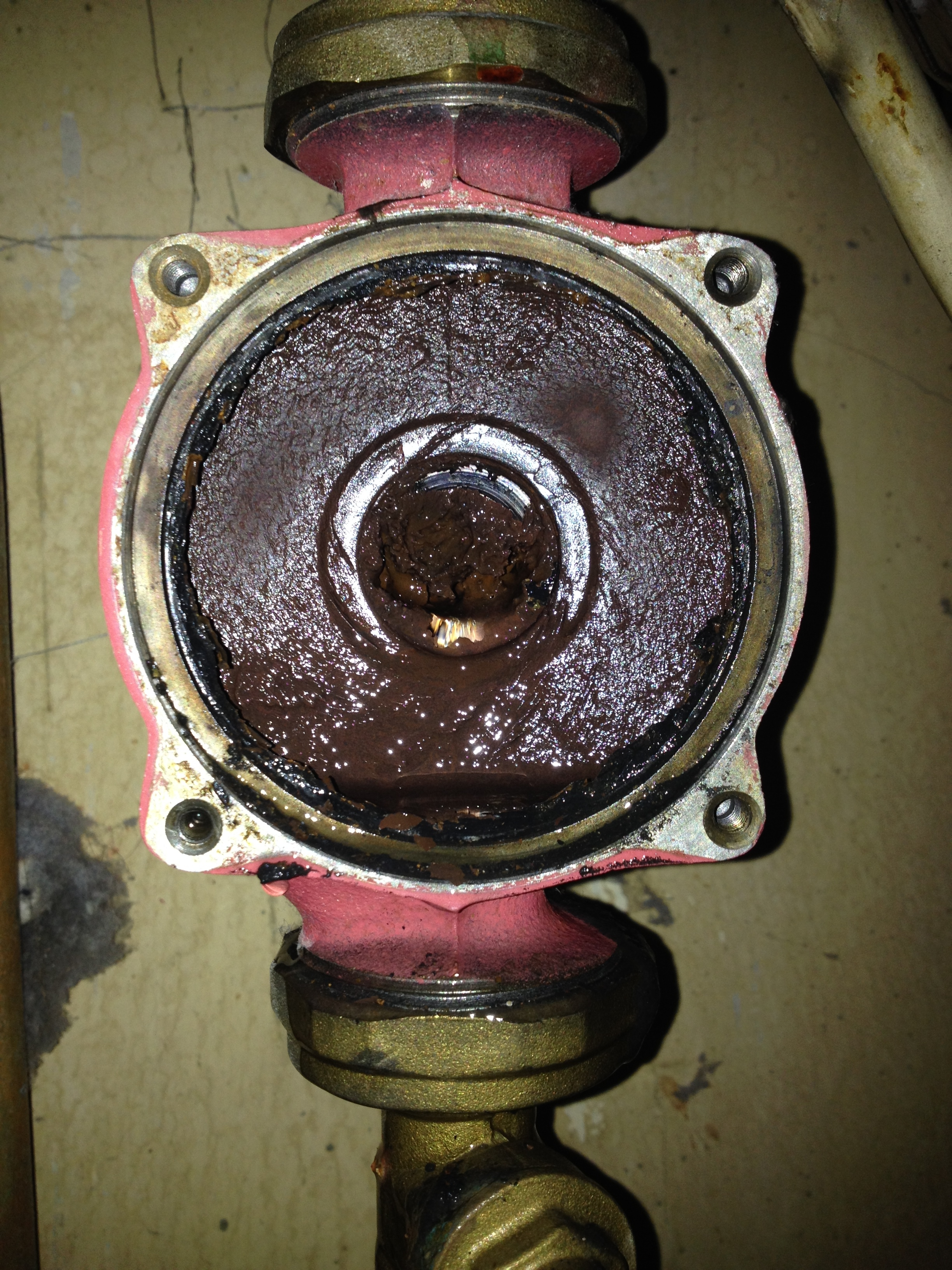
A household circulator pump clogged by contaminants

Circulating pumps are often used to circulate domestic hot water so that a faucet will provide hot water instantly upon demand, or (more conserving of energy) a short time after a user's request for hot water. In regions where water conservation issues are rising in importance with rapidly expanding and urbanizing populations, local water authorities offer rebates to homeowners and builders that install a circulator pump to save water. In typical one-way plumbing without a circulation pump, water is simply piped from the water heater through the pipes to the tap. Once the tap is shut off, the water remaining in the pipes cools producing the familiar wait for hot water the next time the tap is opened. By adding a circulator pump and constantly circulating a small amount of hot water through the pipes from the heater to the furthest fixture and back to the heater, the water in the pipes is always hot, and no water is wasted during the wait. The tradeoff is the energy wasted in operating the pump and the additional demand on the water heater to make up for the heat lost from the constantly hot pipes.

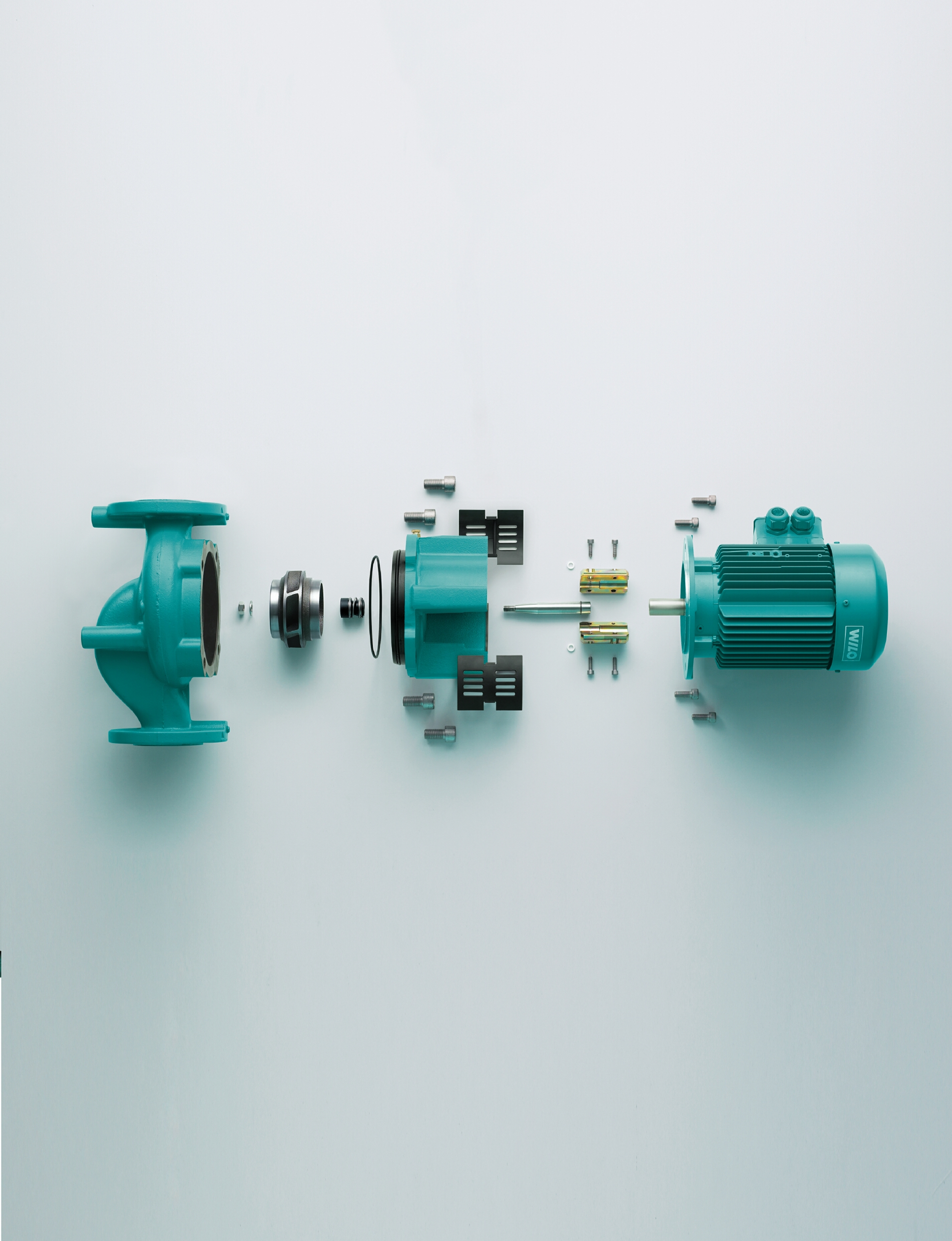
CAD modelled exploded view of a circulator pump with electric engine

While the majority of these pumps mount nearest to the hot water heater and have no adjustable temperature capabilities, a significant reduction in energy can be achieved by using a temperature adjustable thermostatically controlled circulation pump mounted at the last fixture on the loop. Thermostatically controlled circulation pumps allow owners to choose the desired temperature of hot water to be maintained within the hot water pipes since most homes do not require 120 °F (49 °C) degree water instantly out of their taps. Thermostatically controlled circulation pumps cycle on and off to maintain a user's chosen temperature and consume less energy than a continuously operating pump. By installing a thermostatically controlled pump just after the furthest fixture on the loop, cyclic pumping maintains ready hot water up to the last fixture on the loop instead of wasting energy heating the piping from the last fixture to the water heater. Installing a circulation pump at the furthest fixture on a hot water circulation loop is often not feasible due to limited available space, cosmetics, noise restrictions or lack of available power. Recent advancements in hot water circulation technology allow for benefiting from temperature controlled pumping without having to install the pump at the last fixture on the hot water loop. These advanced hot water circulation systems utilize a water contacting temperature probe strategically installed at the last fixture on the loop to minimize the energy wasted heating lengthy return pipes. Thermal insulation applied to the pipes helps mitigate this second loss and minimize the amount of water that must be pumped to keep hot water constantly available.

The traditional hot water recirculation system uses the existing cold water line as return line from the point of use located furthest from the hot water tank back to the hot water tank. The first of two system types has a pump mounted at the hot water heater while a "normally open" thermostatic control valve gets installed at the furthest fixture from the water heater and closes once hot water contacts the valve to control crossover flow between the hot and cold lines. A second type of system uses a thermostatically controlled pump which gets installed at the furthest fixture from the water heater. These thermostatically controlled pumps often have a built-in "normally closed" check-valve which prevents water in the cold water line from entering into the hot water line. Compared to a dedicated return line, using the cold water line as a return has the disadvantage of heating the cold water pipe (and the contained water). Accurate temperature monitoring and active flow control can minimize loss of cold water within the cold water line.

Technological advancements within the industry allow for incorporating timers to limit the operations during specific hours of the day to reduce energy waste by only operating when occupants are likely to use hot water. Additional advancements in technology include pumps which cycle on and off to maintain hot water temperature versus a continuously operating pump which consumes more electrical energy. Reduced energy waste and discomfort is possible by preventing occurrences of hot water line siphoning in open-loop hot water circulation systems which utilize the cold water line to return water back to the water heater. Hot Water Line Siphoning occurs when water from within the hot water line siphons or is forced into the cold water line due to differences in water pressure between the hot and cold water lines. Utilizing "normally closed" solenoid valve significantly reduces energy consumption by preventing siphoning of non-hot water out of hot water lines during cold water use. Using cold water instantly lowers the water pressure in the cold water lines, the higher water pressure in the hot water lines force water through "normally open" thermostatic crossover valves and backflow check valves (which only prevent cold water from flowing into hot water line), increasing the energy demand on the water heater.

== Circulator pump potential side effects ==
It is important to take note of the increased heat in the piping system, which in turn increases system pressure. Piping that is sensitive to the water condition (i.e., copper, and soft water) will be adversely affected by the continual flow. Although water is conserved, the parasitic heat loss through the piping will be greater as a result of the increased heat passing through it.

== Quantitative measures of function ==
During the pump operation, there is a drop of the liquid flow in the center of the rotor, causing the inflow of the liquid through the suction port. In the event of an excessive pressure decrease, in some parts of the rotor, the pressure can be lower than the saturation pressure corresponding to the temperature of the pumped liquid, causing the so-called cavitation, i.e. liquid evaporation. To prevent this, the pressure in the suction port (at the inlet of the pump) should be higher than the saturation pressure corresponding to the liquid temperature by the net positive suction head (NPSH).

The following parameters are characteristic for the circulating pumps: capacity Q, pump pressure ∆p (delivery head ∆H), energy consumption P with pump unit efficiency η, impeller rotational speed n, NPSH and sound level L. In practice, the graphical relationship between the values Q, ∆ p(∆H), P and η is used. These are called the pump curves. They are determined by studies, whose methodology is standardized. These curves are specified when water is pumped with a density of 1000 kg/m3 and kinematic viscosity of 1 mm2/s. When the circulating pump is used for liquids of different density and viscosity, the pump curves have to be recalculated. These curves are provided in catalogues and in operation and maintenance manuals, however their stroke is the subject of pump manufacturers warranty.

== EU regulation for circulators ==
As from 1 January 2013, circulators must comply with European regulation 641/2009. This regulation is part of the ecodesign policy of the European Union.

== See also ==
- Zone valve

== Bibliography ==
- Rubika, M, ed. (2005). Instalacje, gazowe, ogrzewcze, wentylacyjne i wodno-kanalizacyjne w budownictwie (in Polish). Poznań: Wydawnictwo Forum Sp. z o.o.
- Rubik, M. Pompy obiegowe w instalacjach c.o. i c.w.u (in Polish).
