= Thermostatic radiator valve =

Self-regulating valve to control hot water flow

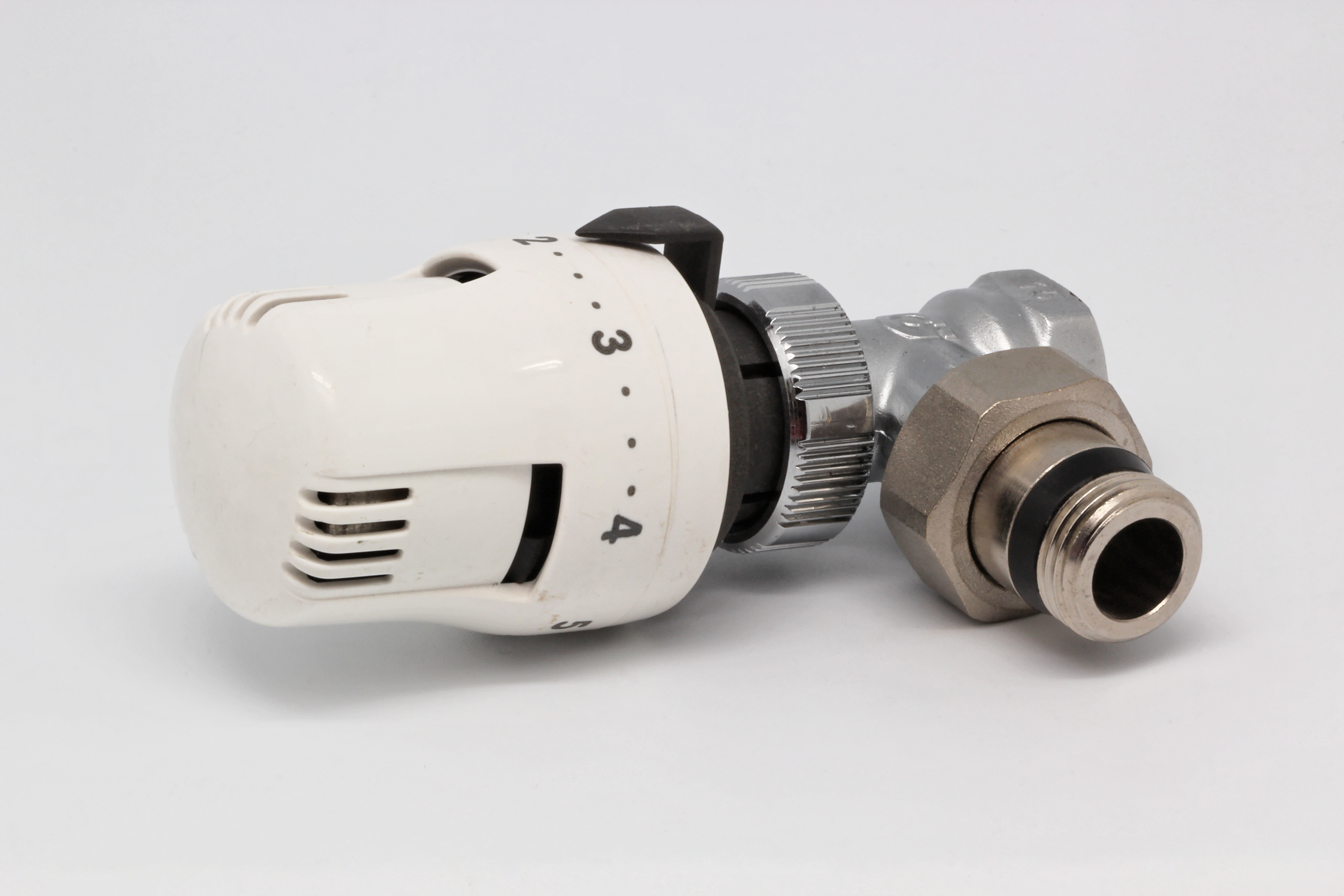
A thermostatic radiator valve on position 2 (15–17 °C)

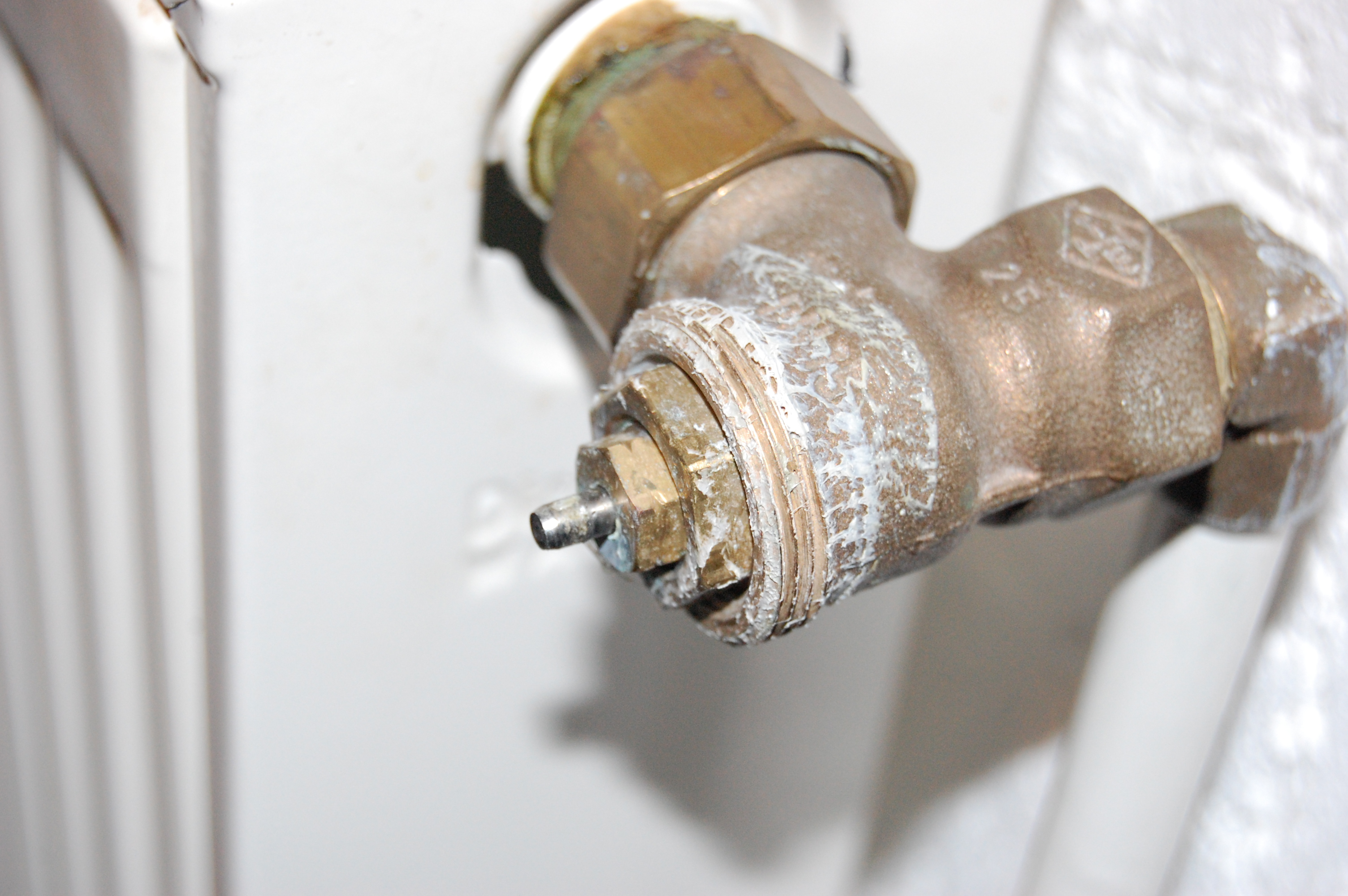
A sprung radiator valve with the wax-motor thermostatic controller removed. With the controller removed the valve is fully open so the radiator simply operates at full power; with the controller in place, as air temperature increases the wax motor depresses the protruding pin, closing the valve.

A thermostatic radiator valve (TRV) is a self-regulating valve fitted to a hot-water heating system radiator to control the temperature of a room by changing the flow of hot water to the radiator.

== Functioning ==
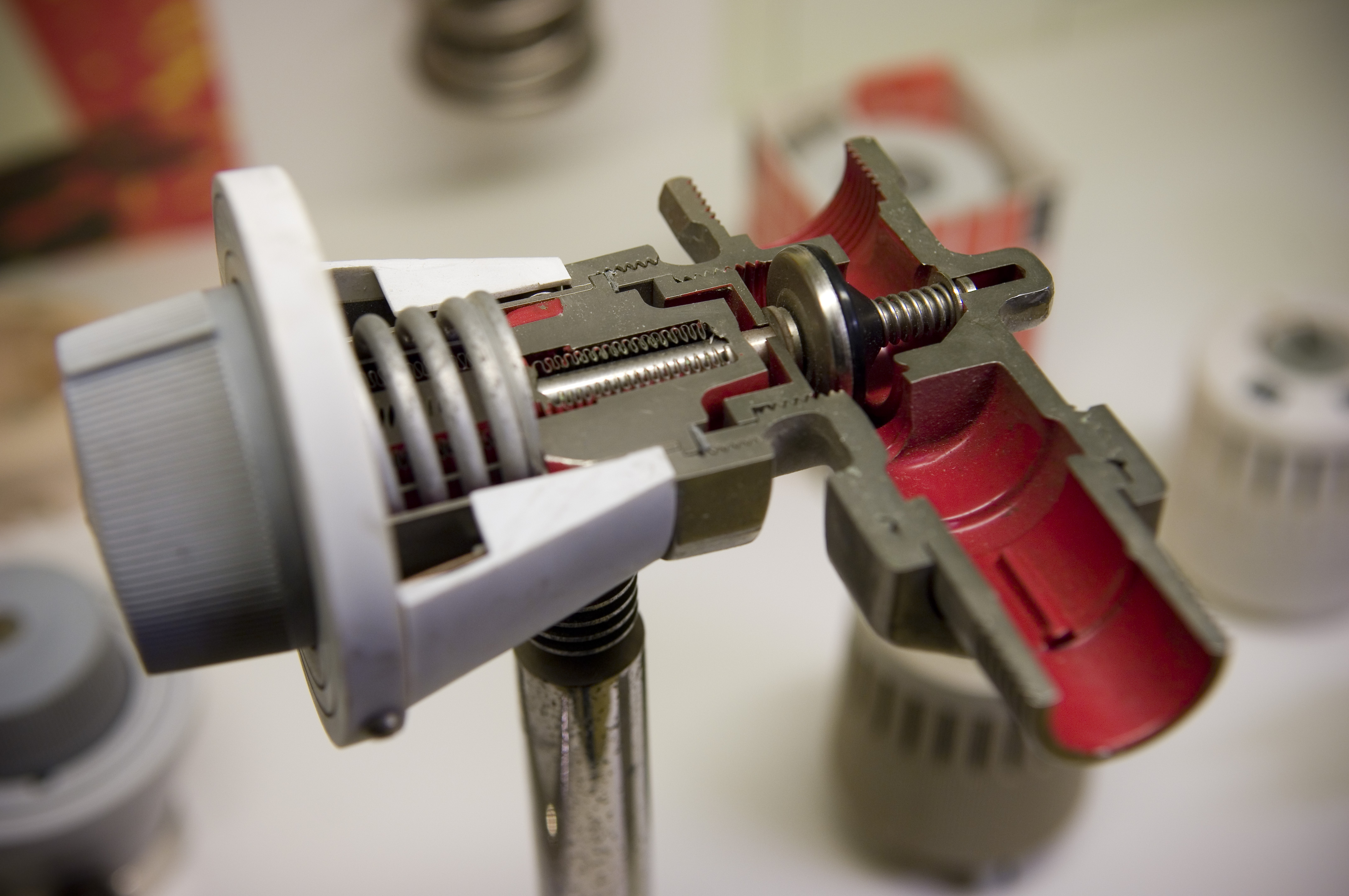
Cutaway model of a thermostatic radiator valve

=== Conventional wax motor TRV ===
The classic thermostatic radiator valve contains a plug, typically made of wax (forming a wax motor), which expands or contracts with the surrounding temperature. This plug is connected to a pin which in turn is connected to a valve. The valve gradually closes as the temperature of the surrounding area increases, limiting the amount of hot water entering the radiator. This allows a maximum temperature to be set for each room.

As the valve works by sensing the temperature of the air surrounding it, it is important to ensure that it is not covered by material (such as curtains). If the controller is removed from the valve, the valve opens fully.

=== Interaction with room thermostats ===
Thermostatic radiator valves should not be installed in the same room where a system-controlling air-temperature thermostat is installed. This is because in the case that the TRV set temperature is below the room thermostat set temperature, the TRV would shut the radiator off before the latter temperature is reached. The central heating boiler would continue to run in an attempt to reach the room thermostat set temperature, potentially heating the rest of the house to uncomfortably high levels if TRVs are not installed on the radiators in every room. If both TRV and thermostat set temperatures were set equally, unpredictable behaviour may occur with both devices attempting to control the room temperature. Therefore, in case of installing a TRV and an air-temperature–based boiler thermostat in the same room, the TRV should be set to a higher temperature than the room thermostat.

=== Compared to manual control ===
The replacement of a manual heating control with a conventional wax motor TRV has been estimated to save at least 280 kilograms (620 lb) of CO_{2} per year (in 2011 for a British semi-detached house with three bedrooms and gas heating). They are also considerably cost-efficient, using heat only when needed, and can reduce heating bills by up to 17 percent a year.

=== Electronically controlled variants ===
As of 2012, electronically controlled TRVs have become more common, and some of these are marketed as smart thermostats or even smart TRVs. They frequently use electronic temperature sensing and can often be programmed or remote-controlled so that individual radiators in a house can be programmed for different temperatures at different times of the day or automatically respond to occupancy and occupancy patterns. Such increased control allows reduction of energy use and CO_{2} emissions. Another possibility with such systems is that the temperature sensor can be placed more appropriately, away from the radiator, which may result in a more relevant temperature reading for controlling the radiator operating point. Some electronically controlled valves run on batteries which must be changed at regular intervals, while others can be connected to the power grid. Electronically controlled variants may also require additional setup, for example by connecting to a mobile phone application through a smart home hub using wireless protocols such as Zigbee or Z-Wave.

== Temperature scales ==
Instead of marking the adjustment knobs with temperature in the Celsius scale, many manufacturers use a simpler scale, often from 1 to 5. As each TRV has some variations in their production, as the room size is unknown, as the level of insulation is unknown, and the radiator water temperature is unknown, it is impossible to predict exactly what temperature each setting will result in, but broadly manufacturers tend to manufacture under a set of assumptions that means 3 results in a "comfortable temperature". The table below gives some examples of conversion from proprietary scales to the Celsius scale.

Position of TRV head		Temperature		Recommended use
Danfoss	Caleffi	(°C)	(°F)	Recommended use
❄	❄	7	44.6	Frost protection
	1	12	53.6	Cellar, stairs
1		13	55.4	
		14		
		15	59	Laundry room
	2	16	60.8	Entrance hall
2	•	17	62.6	Entrance hall
•	•	18	64.4	Bedroom
•	•	19	66.2	Kitchen
3	3	20	68	Living room
•	•	21	69.8	Living room
•	•	22	71.6	Bathroom
4	•	23	73.4	Bathroom
	4	24	75.2	
		25		
5		26	78.8	
		27		
	5	28	82.4	

== Physical connection standards ==
There are several different standards for the screw connection between the thermostatic mechanism of the TRV and the valve on the radiator. Some common examples are:

- M28×1.5 valve (27.5 mm): Used by MMA, Herz, Orkli, COMAP, T+A, and others
- Caleffi valve
- Danfoss: Several variants, for example K valve (M30x1.5), RA valve (23 mm), RAV valve (34 mm), RAVL valve (26 mm) and RTD valve
- Giacomini valve

== See also ==
- Thermostatic mixing valve
- Wax thermostatic element
- Thermostat
