= Automatic balancing valve =

Component of central heating and cooling systems

Automatic balancing valves are utilised in central heating and cooling systems that rely on flow of water through the system. They use the latest flow technology to ensure that the design flow rate is achieved at all times irrespective of any pressure changes within the system.

== Purpose ==
A cooling or heating water distribution system is in balance when the flow in the whole system (through the component terminal lines, distributing lines and main distributing lines) corresponds to the flow rates that were specified for the design of the system. If the correct balancing of the system is not established, this will result in unequal distribution of the flow, so that there will be a surplus effect in some of the terminals, whereas the effect will be inadequate in others. As a consequence, the required heating or cooling will not be ensured in all parts of the installation. Practically, it is not possible to achieve a completely balanced system by manipulation of the piping or alteration of the pipe dimensions only. Only a correct set of balancing valves can ensure the correct distribution of the flow in the system.

== Typical design flow rates ==
In a variable primary chilled-water system, the design flow rate is determined by the water flow velocity in the tube of the coils.

- At typical conditions, 6–7 feet per second (1.8–2.1 m/s)
- Maximum 12 ft/s (3.7 m/s)
- Minimum 1.5 ft/s (0.46 m/s) (based on a Reynolds number of 7500)
- Minimum flow is typically 50% or less of the design flow.
- Chiller manufacturers typically limit the tube velocities in the range from 5.0 to 10.0 feet per second (1.5 to 3.0 m/s).

== Constant and variable flow systems ==
Automatic balancing systems can be classified as constant-flow or variable-flow.

Until recently, constant flow systems were standard in heating, ventilation and air-conditioning (HVAC) systems. Constant flow uses a straightforward and simple design that can be applied to a broad range of projects. This involves the use of a fixed-speed pump that is set to the maximum load of the system. In addition, double-regulating balancing valves are manually set to regulate the impact of pressure changes across the system.

CAV (constant air volume) systems are mainly used in offices made up of a single area (e.g. open plan), where the temperature of the supply air is varied in response to a thermostat.

This type of system can also be used in offices with different areas and different loads: in this case the temperature of the supply air emitted into the different zones can be varied through use of a hot-water supplied re-heat coil located in the air duct leading to the related zone; alternatively, double duct systems can be used where two separate ducts for hot and cold air lead into a mixing box where the two flows are mixed together.

This type of system enables precise temperature control, but is more suitable for small offices. The necessary air ducts takes up a lot of space and are expensive to install, and they can also waste energy during the mid-seasons, where there might be simultaneous requests for heating or cooling in different parts of the office

Although the capital costs of installing a constant flow system are relatively low, the manual balancing required is time-consuming, complicated, laborious and system is inefficient. This results in higher running costs and subsequently resulting in higher CO_{2} emissions. Since most air-conditioning and water distribution systems only reach peak load for limited periods, energy is wasted by continually running the pumps at a fixed speed.

In variable-flow hydronic systems, reducing pump speed or staging of pumps with boilers and chillers to suit part-load conditions is an energy efficient method of control.

VAV (variable air flow) systems meet the needs of large modern commercial-use buildings, with internal spaces divided into open-plan areas. They are particularly effective for reacting to changes in cooling requests in the indoor areas. Air in the perimeter areas, which can be very different depending on the season and the location, is treated by way of VAV boxes fitted with re-heating coils, to modulate flow rates when in cooling mode and to operate in constant mode instead, using re-heat coils, during winter.

The total airflow treated and distributed by a VAV system is less than a CAV system, when it is calculated based on the maximum simultaneous load. As such, the size of the processing units are smaller, as are the ducts and therefore energy consumption related to the air distribution process.

== Pressure-independent balancing and control valve ==
=== Control valves in variable-flow chilled-water systems ===
As hydronic systems have changed, the necessary valve sizing calculations have also changed.

Variable flow systems require new calculations, new terminology and, most importantly, new technology. The aim when sizing control valves is to find the perfect valve solution for the system. Finding that perfect valve involves understanding the hydronics of the project and recognizing the importance of perfect control flow.

=== Control-valve selection ===
The effects a variable flow system had on the selection of control valves, was not initially realized. A control valve was selected by using the same K_{v} calculation, and the bypass on a 3-port valve blocked, giving a 2-port valve. It was not that simple. This is because our K_{v} calculation

K_{v} = flow rate [m^{3}/h] / ΔP [bar

was based on a constant pressure and a constant K_{v}, delivering a constant flow. However, as areas of the variable-flow system closed down the differential pressure increased, stepping up the delivery flow and causing overflow in the open circuits.

Overflow in a circuit is costly. Traditional control valves make it inevitable. As we size a control valve, the K_{v} calculated almost certainly will not match the K_{v} of the nearest appropriate valve. For example, a K_{v} calculation of 4.5 m^{3}/h would most likely lead to the selection of a valve with a K_{v} = 6.3 m^{3}/h. This means the valve is capable of delivering 40% more flow than required. As pressure increases in our variable flow system, our valve will deliver this extra pressure flow.

This excess flow will cause the temperature to over-shoot the set-point. Once the room sensor has detected this overflow it will close the actuator, causing a sharp drop in flow. The process will repeat itself in a phenomenon described as "hunting".

=== Hunting ===
Hunting causes the room temperature to constantly fluctuate, creating a major cost to clients with poor environmental quality and increased maintenance. Over three-quarters of complaints to managers are of a thermal sensation nature. These complaints are rarely due to inter-individual differences in preferred temperature but, instead, to increases as temperature deviation widens. The solution that more than two-thirds of building managers use to answer this type of complaint is to change the set-point. By lowering the set-point by an average of 1 °C in a cooling system we increase its energy usage by up to 10%. The solution to the problems of "hunting" and overflow in chilled water systems lies in the use of pressure independent control valves.

=== Pressure-independent control valves ===
Pressure independent control valves are used to limit the flow to the fan coil terminal and air handling unit. This flow is not affected by changes in inlet pressure. A diaphragm within the valve keeps the outlet pressure constant, and this delivers a constant flow to the terminal. The added advantage of pressure independent control valves is that, when fitted with an actuator, they replace the manual balancing valve and motorized control valve with a single valve, thus reducing installation cost.

=== Electronic Pressure-independent control valves ===
Electronic Pressure-independent control valves use a flow meter or a pressure drop across an orifice to provide flow data to an actuator that works to provide the correct flow down stream. These valves offer much lower pressure requirements as a pressure regulator requires a pressure within a range to achieve operation. They increase flexibility as there settable flow range is often significantly larger than their mechanical counterparts, they also offer improved dirt tolerance thanks to a simplified water path and some the capability to report flow rates to the building management system.

=== Control-valve strategy ===
Pressure independent control valves can be used with any control system. The actuator options give a choice of thermal, 3-point control, or modulating control. This will work with building management systems and individual room controls, in the same way as traditional control valves. The actuators can also be used to set the valve by limiting flow. In 3-point control applications, this can be done using a runtime limitation. For example, for 70% design flow we give the actuator 70% of its total run time. With a modulating actuator, to achieve our 70% example we set the controller to control between 0 V and 7 V of the 0–10 V signal.

=== Conclusion ===
Overflow affects the ability of the control system to achieve the set temperature. It need not be inevitable. Some pressure independent control valves enable fan coils and air handling units to have the maximal flow set exactly at design flow. Switching a traditional control valve to a pressure independent type should not be seen as only benefiting the mechanical contractor, by reducing installation cost. It benefits the systems integrator and most importantly the client, ensuring both improved comfort levels with reduced energy consumption. Pressure independent control valves are an essential part of the hydronic control in chilled water applications. They are simple to select and easy to set. They enable a steady pressure, a steady flow and most importantly a steady room temperature.

== Differential-pressure controller ==
As opposed to having a pressure regulating device on each terminal unit, one larger differential pressure controller can be used when the terminals are in parallel. The Dp controller maintains a constant pressure across the riser and therefore across each terminal unit. This reduces the cost of the system by only having one pressure independent unit and also keeps the advantages of having a manual balancing valve at each terminal (measurement, adjustment, positive shutoff).
