= Aquastax =

2006 video game

- AquaStax splashscreen
- Developer(s): InfoSpace; IOMO
- Publisher(s): InfoSpace
- Designer(s): Fergus McNeill
- Programmer(s): Steve Longhurst
- Engine: J2ME
- Platform(s): Mobile game
- Release: EU: 2006
- Genre(s): Platform game
- Mode(s): Single-player

Aquastax is a J2ME mobile game developed by Infospac (formerly iomo).

The game was well-received and often mentioned as a cross between Tetris and Lemmings.

== Gameplay ==
The game features 50 timed-levels where the player has to guide the little people called 'Gumblers' up, away from rising waters, to a safe place. When a path is cleared above them, they will throw up a rope to indicate they are able to climb up. That can be achieved by dropping interlocking blocksfrom above to dictate the Gumbler's path to safety. The block shapes can have sloping surfaces, meaning that badly stacked blocks can slide off and fall down easily. The levels spanned different world types, including Beach, Lava, Toxic & Industrial, each with different hazards, like hungry seagulls or stinging wasps. The player gets to be scored based on the number of Gumblers saved, the time taken and the number of blocks used. At the end of each level, the user can enter a 3-character-tag for their hi-score records.

In-Game action: a group of Gumblers wait for the path to the exit to be cleared.

== Development ==
The game was part of IOMO's strategy to foster and create brand-new IP as part of the new Infospace group strategy. Other games in this period include the award-winning Dirty Sanchez title. The name Gumblers originated after the project QA Lead Mark Rodgers successfully petitioned IOMO to name them after his former boss Dave Gumble.

It was heavily promoted on Infospace's behalf at trade-events and featured promotional videos and demonstrations during 2005. Fergus McNeill and John Chasey fronted the promotion for Aquastax at the CTIA Wireless 2005 trade show - as was reported by GameSpot's Stephen Palley, "...InfoSpace Mobile's Aqua Stax looks like the real deal--a brand-new puzzle game that actually has a halfway original concept behind it.".

The official trailer used during the 2005 promotion tour was subsequently uploaded for posterity by Steve Longhurst: "...A fair bit of effort was spent promoting it too, including creating this video.".

== Reception ==
IGN praised the development team's efforts by adding "...at a show where I have seen more than a fair share of licensed games, it's refreshing to see something completely original."
