= Thermostatic mixing valve =

Valve that blends hot water and cold water

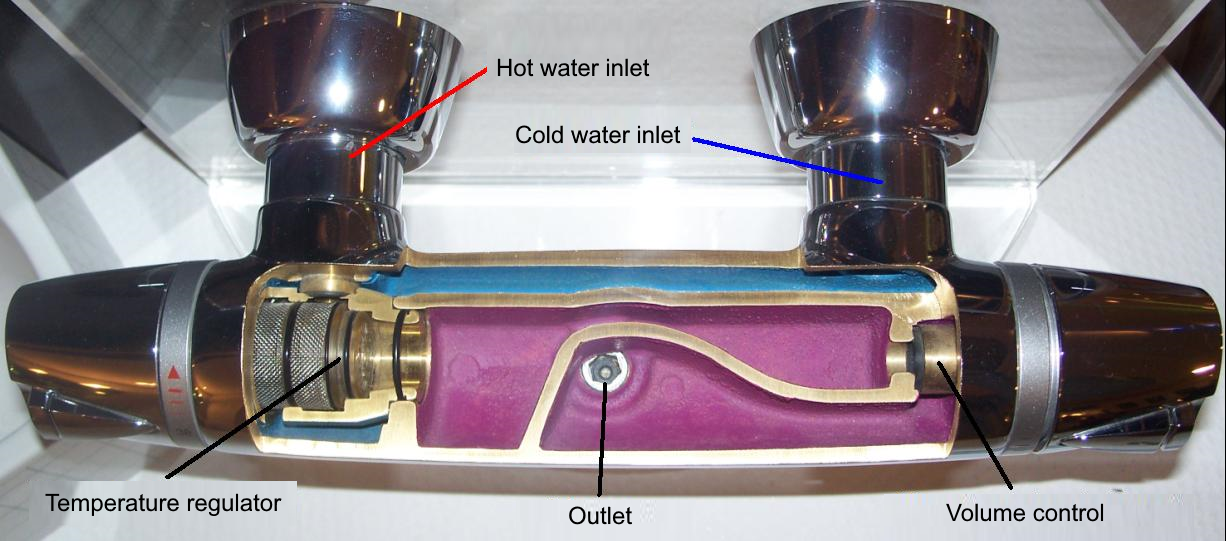
A cutaway model of a thermostatic mixing valve, indicating the hot and cold water inlets, temperature regulator, volume control, and outlet

A thermostatic mixing valve (TMV) is a valve that blends hot and cold water to ensure a nearly constant output temperature, such as for safe shower and bath temperatures to prevent scalding.

The storage of water at high temperature removes one possible breeding ground for Legionella; the use of a thermostat, rather than a static mixing valve, provides increased safety against scalding, and increased user comfort, because the hot-water temperature remains constant.

Many TMVs use a wax thermostat for regulation. They also shut off rapidly in the event of a hot or cold supply failure to prevent scalding or thermal shock.

It is increasingly common practice around the world to regulate the storage water temperature to above 60 °C (140 °F), and to circulate or distribute water at a temperature less than 50 °C (122 °F). Water above these temperatures can cause scald injuries. Many countries, states, or municipalities now require that the temperature of all bath water in newly built and extensively refurbished domestic properties be controlled to a maximum of 48 °C (118 °F). Installing thermostatic mixing valves can ensure that water is delivered at the required temperature, thereby reducing the risk of scalding accidents; it also reduces hot water consumption from a supply that is maintained at a higher temperature.

There are three main categories for water temperature controlling devices: heat source, group control, and point of use.

Heat source

These are used with central heating systems that use water as a medium.

- Tempering valves for use on hot-water heat-distribution systems
- High flow rates suitable for use in under-floor (radiant) heating applications
- Allows water to be stored at a higher temperature

Group control

These provide a uniform distribution temperature for all hot water outlets in a household.

- Designed for multi-point applications
- High flow rates (from 14 to 51 US gallons per minute (53 to 193 L/min) at 45 pounds per square inch (3.1 bar))
- Temperature stability

Point-of-use

These are single-outlet thermostatic mixing valves, often called "thermostatic faucets", "thermostat taps" or "thermostat valves".

- Designed for single-point applications, such as individual showering, hand-wash basin mixers, bath or tub fillers
- High-level protection against scalding and thermal shock

Although other temperature-regulating valves exist, thermostatic mixing valves are the preferred type in healthcare facilities, as they limit maximum outlet temperature regardless of pressure or flow.

== See also ==
- Thermostatic radiator valve
- Pressure-balanced valve
