= Hydronics =

Use of liquid or gaseous water in heating or cooling systems

Hydronics (from Ancient Greek hydro- 'water') is the use of liquid water or gaseous water (steam) or a water solution (usually glycol with water) as a heat-transfer medium in heating and cooling systems. The name differentiates such systems from oil and refrigerant systems.

Historically, in large-scale commercial buildings such as high-rise and campus facilities, a hydronic system may include both a chilled and a heated water loop, to provide for both heating and air conditioning. Chillers and cooling towers are used either separately or together as means to provide water cooling, while boilers heat water. A recent innovation is the chiller boiler system, which provides an efficient form of HVAC for homes and smaller commercial spaces.

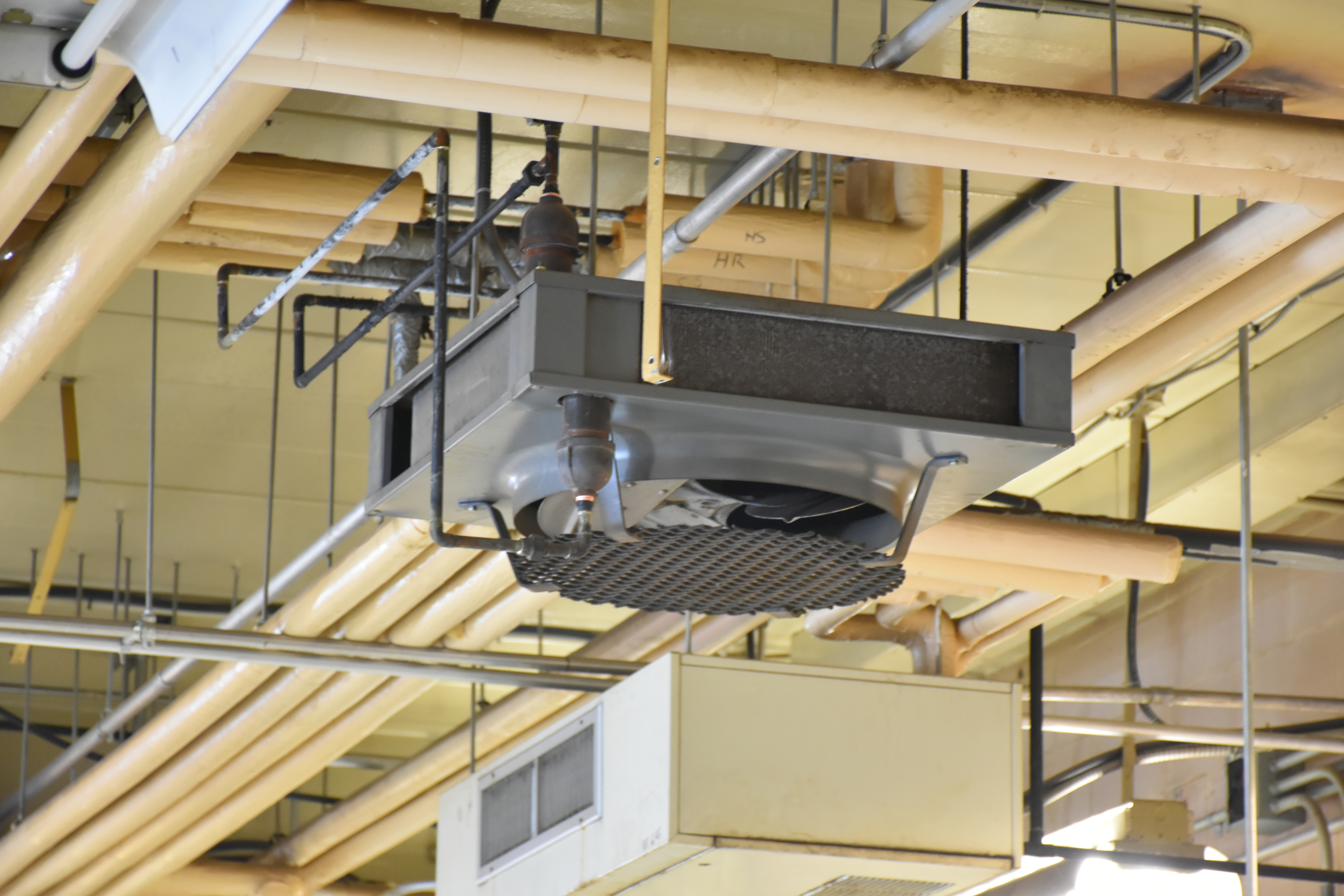
A hydronic fan unit heater used for maintaining warmth within an industrial setting. The fan draws cool, ambient air through the heat exchanger around the perimeter of the housing with pipes carrying hot glycol, and expels it out the centre.

== District heating ==
Many larger cities have a district heating system that provides, through underground piping, publicly available high temperature hot water and chilled water. A building in the service district may be connected to these on payment of a service fee.

== Types of hydronic system ==
=== Basic types ===
Hydronic systems can include the following kinds of distributions:

- Chilled water systems
- Hot water systems
- Steam systems
- Steam condensate systems
- Ground source heat pump systems

=== Classification ===
Hydronic systems are further classified in five ways:

- Flow generation (forced flow or gravity flow)
- Temperature (low, medium, and high)
- Pressurization (low, medium, and high)
- Piping arrangement
- Pumping arrangement

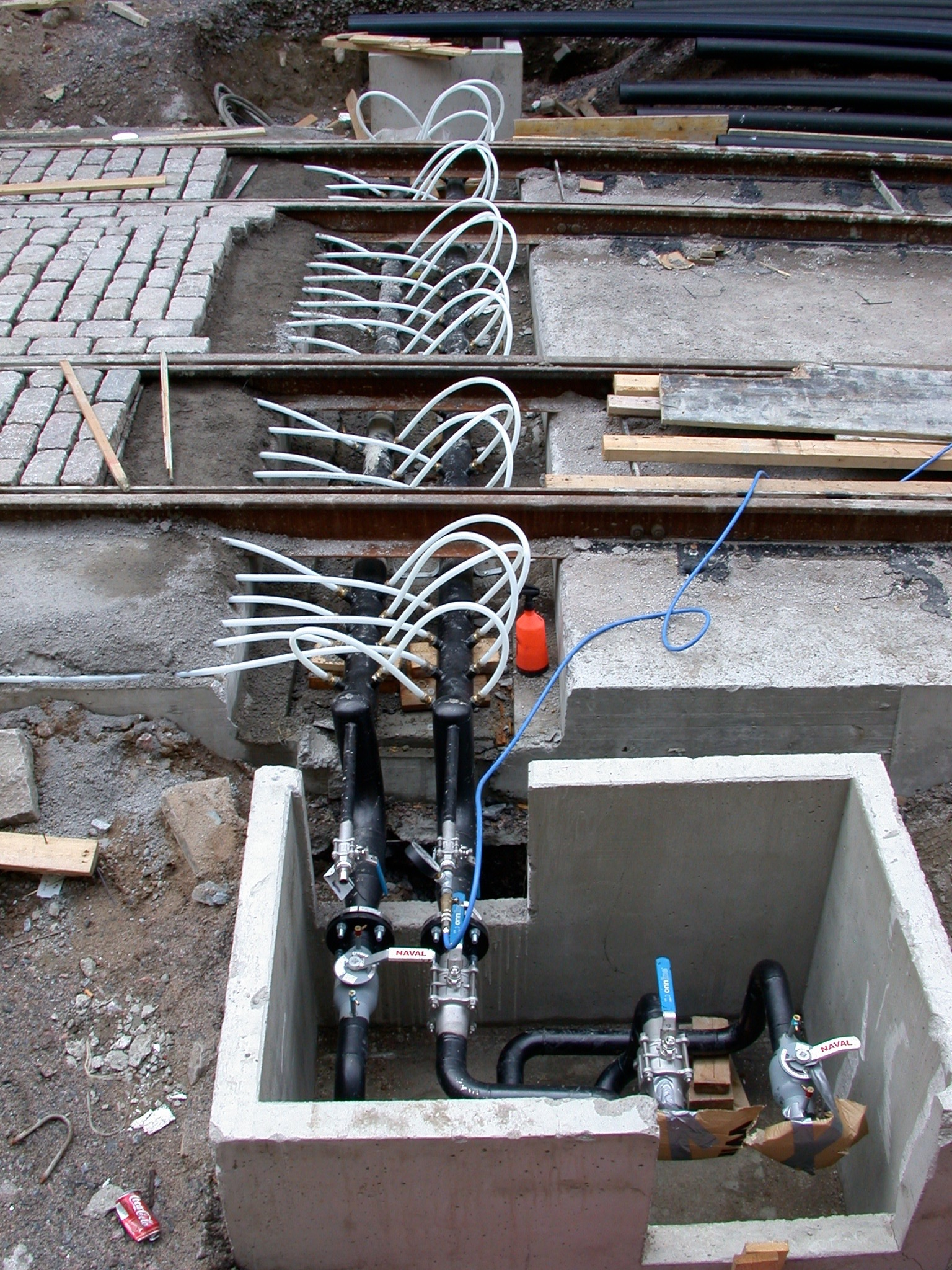
Snow melting hydronics on rail tracks in a roadway (Helsinki, 2015)

=== Piping arrangements ===
Hydronic systems may be divided into several general piping arrangement categories:

- Single or one-pipe
- Two pipe steam (direct return or reverse return)
- Three pipe
- Four pipe
- Series loop

== Single-pipe steam ==
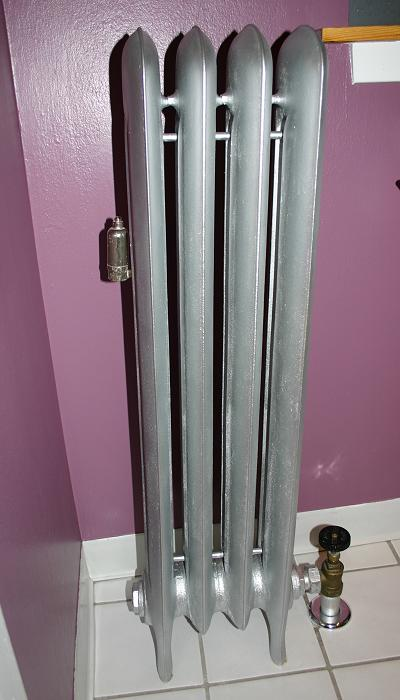
Single-pipe steam radiator

In the oldest modern hydronic heating technology, a single-pipe steam system delivers steam to the radiators where the steam gives up its heat and is condensed back to water. The radiators and steam supply pipes are pitched so that gravity eventually takes this condensate back down through the steam supply piping to the boiler where it can once again be turned into steam and returned to the radiators.

Despite its name, a radiator does not primarily heat a room by radiation. If positioned correctly a radiator will create an air convection current in the room, which will provide the main heat transfer mechanism. It is generally agreed that for the best results a steam radiator should be no more than one to two inches (2.5 to 5cm) from a wall.

Single-pipe systems are limited in both their ability to deliver high volumes of steam (that is, heat) and the ability to control the flow of steam to individual radiators (because closing off the steam supply traps condensate in the radiators). Because of these limitations, single-pipe systems are no longer preferred.

These systems depend on the proper operation of thermostatic air-venting valves located on radiators throughout the heated area. When the system is not in use, these valves are open to the atmosphere, and radiators and pipes contain air. When a heating cycle begins, the boiler produces steam, which expands and displaces the air in the system. The air exits the system through the air-venting valves on the radiators and on the steam pipes themselves. The thermostatic valves close when they become hot; in the most common kind, the vapor pressure of a small amount of alcohol in the valve exerts the force to actuate the valve and prevent steam from leaving the radiator. When the valve cools, air enters the system to replace the condensing steam.

Some more modern valves can be adjusted to allow for more rapid or slower venting. In general, valves nearest to the boiler should vent the slowest, and valves furthest from the boiler should vent the fastest. Ideally, steam should reach each valve and close each and every valve at the same time, so that the system can work at maximal efficiency; this condition is known as a "balanced" system.

== Two-pipe steam systems ==
In two-pipe steam systems, there is a return path for the condensate and it may involve pumps as well as gravity-induced flow. The flow of steam to individual radiators can be modulated using manual or automatic valves.

== Two-pipe direct return system ==
The return piping, as the name suggests, takes the most direct path back to the boiler.

=== Advantages ===
Lower cost of return piping in most (but not all) applications, and the supply and return piping are separated.

=== Disadvantages ===
This system can be difficult to balance due to the supply line being a different length than the return; the further the heat transfer device is from the boiler, the more pronounced the pressure difference. Because of this, it is always recommended to: minimize the distribution piping pressure drops; use a pump with a flat head characteristic, include balancing and flow-measuring devices at each terminal or branch circuit; and use control valves with a high head loss at the terminals.

== Two-pipe reverse return system ==
The two-pipe reverse return configuration which is sometimes called 'the three-pipe system' is different from the two-pipe system in the way that water returns to the boiler. In a two-pipe system, once the water has left the first radiator, it returns to the boiler to be reheated, and so with the second and third etc. With the two-pipe reverse return, the return pipe travels to the last radiator in the system before returning to the boiler to be reheated.

=== Advantages ===
The advantage with the two-pipe reverse return system is that the pipe run to each radiator is about the same, this ensures that the frictional resistance to the flow of water in each radiator is the same. This allows easy balancing of the system.

=== Disadvantages ===
The installer or repair person cannot trust that every system is self-balancing without properly testing it.

== Water loops ==
Modern systems almost always use heated water rather than steam. This opens the system to the possibility of also using chilled water to provide air conditioning.

In homes, the water loop may be as simple as a single pipe that "loops" the flow through every radiator in a zone. In such a system, flow to the individual radiators cannot be modulated as all of the water is flowing through every radiator in the zone. Slightly more complicated systems use a "main" pipe that flows uninterrupted around the zone; the individual radiators tap off a small portion of the flow in the main pipe. In these systems, individual radiators can be modulated. Alternatively, a number of loops with several radiators can be installed, the flow in each loop or zone controlled by a zone valve connected to a thermostat.

In most water systems, the water is circulated by means of one or more circulator pumps. This is in marked contrast to steam systems where the inherent pressure of the steam is sufficient to distribute the steam to remote points in the system. A system may be broken up into individual heating zones using either multiple circulator pumps or a single pump and electrically operated zone valves.

== Improved efficiency and operating costs ==
There have been considerable improvements in the efficiency and therefore the operating costs of a hydronic heating system with the introduction of insulating products.

Radiator Panel system pipes are covered with a fire rated, flexible and lightweight elastomeric rubber material designed for thermal insulation. Slab Heating efficiency is improved with the installation of a thermal barrier made of foam. There are now many product offerings on the market with different energy ratings and installation methods.

== Balancing ==
Most hydronic systems require balancing. This involves measuring and setting the flow to achieve an optimal distribution of energy in the system. In a balanced system every radiator gets just enough hot water to allow it to heat up fully.

== Water treatment ==
Residential hydronic systems may use ordinary tap water, while larger commercial and industrial closed-loop systems commonly use treated water or water-glycol mixtures. Water treatment is used to maintain suitable water chemistry, limit corrosion and fouling, control biological growth, and protect system components.

Common treatment and monitoring considerations include:

Corrosion control – Corrosion inhibitors may be added to reduce corrosion of steel, iron, copper, and other system metals. Maintaining an appropriate pH is also important because the preferred range depends on the materials used in the system; aluminum components generally require tighter pH control than steel or iron. Oxygen control – Although the system is closed, dissolved oxygen may enter through leaks, pump seals, expansion equipment, maintenance activities, or additions of makeup water. Oxygen can accelerate corrosion and contribute to the formation of iron oxides and other corrosion products. Makeup-water control – Closed-loop systems are intended to operate with relatively little water replacement. Frequent additions of fresh water can introduce oxygen and dissolved minerals while diluting corrosion inhibitors and other treatment chemicals. Freeze protection – Antifreeze solutions, commonly based on glycol, may be used where system water could be exposed to freezing temperatures. Microbiological control – Biocides may be used to limit bacterial growth and biofilm formation. Biological activity can contribute to fouling, localized corrosion, and degradation of glycol-based heat-transfer fluids. Deposit and fouling control – Corrosion products, suspended solids, and other contaminants can accumulate in low-flow areas, heat exchangers, and other portions of the system, reducing heat transfer or restricting flow. Air and flow management – Entrained air, improper system pressurization, dead legs, and areas of low flow can create localized conditions that promote corrosion or allow water chemistry to vary within the system. Leak detection – Some systems use tracers or dyes, including compounds that fluoresce under ultraviolet light, to help locate fluid loss.

Because closed-loop systems normally lose little water, deterioration may occur gradually and remain unnoticed for extended periods. Periodic testing of water chemistry, inhibitor concentration, corrosion products, glycol condition, and microbiological activity can therefore be used to verify that the circulating fluid remains within appropriate operating limits.

== Air elimination ==
All hydronic systems must have a means to eliminate air from the system. A properly designed, air-free system should continue to function normally for many years.

Air causes irritating system noises, and interrupts proper heat transfer to and from the circulating fluids. In addition, unless reduced below an acceptable level, the oxygen dissolved in water causes corrosion. This corrosion can cause rust and scale to build up on the piping. Over time these particles can become loose and travel around the pipes, reducing or even blocking the flow as well as damaging pump seals and other components.

=== Water-loop system ===
Water-loop systems can also experience air problems. Air found within hydronic water-loop systems may be classified into three forms:

==== Free air ====
Various devices such as manual and automatic air vents are used to address free air which floats up to the high points throughout the system. Automatic air vents contain a valve that is operated by a float. When air is present, the float drops, allowing the valve to open and bleed air out. When water reaches (fills) the valve, the float lifts, blocking the water from escaping. Small (domestic) versions of these valves in older systems are sometimes fitted with a Schrader-type air valve fitting, and any trapped, now-compressed air can be bled from the valve by manually depressing the valve stem until water rather than air begins to emerge.

==== Entrained air ====
Entrained air is air bubbles that travel around in the piping at the same velocity as the water. Air "scoops" are one example of products which attempt to remove this type of air.

==== Dissolved air ====
Dissolved air is also present in the system water and the amount is determined principally by the temperature and pressure (see Henry's law) of the incoming water. On average, tap water contains between 8-10% dissolved air by volume.

Removal of dissolved, free and entrained air can only be achieved with a high-efficiency air elimination device that includes a coalescing medium that continually scrubs the air out of the system. Tangential or centrifugal style air separator devices are limited to removal of free and entrained air only.

== Accommodating thermal expansion ==
Water expands as it heats and contracts as it cools. A water-loop hydronic system must have one or more expansion tanks in the system to accommodate this varying volume of the working fluid. These tanks often use a rubber diaphragm pressurised with compressed air. The expansion tank accommodates the expanded water by further air compression and helps maintain a roughly constant pressure in the system across the expected change in fluid volume. Simple cisterns open to atmospheric pressure are also used.

Water also expands drastically as it vaporizes, or flashes, into steam. Sparge pipes can help accommodate flashing that may occur as high pressure condensate enters a lower pressure region.

== Automatic fill mechanisms ==
Hydronic systems are usually connected to a water supply (such as the public water supply). An automatic valve regulates the amount of water in the system and also prevents backflow of system water (and any water treatment chemicals) into the water supply.

== Safety mechanisms ==
Excessive heat or pressure may cause the system to fail. At least one combination over-temperature and over-pressure relief valve is always fitted to the system to allow the steam or water to vent to the atmosphere in case of the failure of some mechanism (such as the boiler temperature control) rather than allowing the catastrophic bursting of the piping, radiators, or boiler. The relief valve usually has a manual operating handle to allow testing and the flushing of contaminants (such as grit) that may cause the valve to leak under otherwise-normal operating conditions.

Rapid condensation of steam can also lead to water hammer, which during rapid volume change from gas to liquid leads to a powerful vacuum force. This can damage and destroy fittings, valves and equipment. Proper design and the addition of vacuum breakers reduce or eliminate the risk of these problems.

== Typical schematic with control devices shown ==
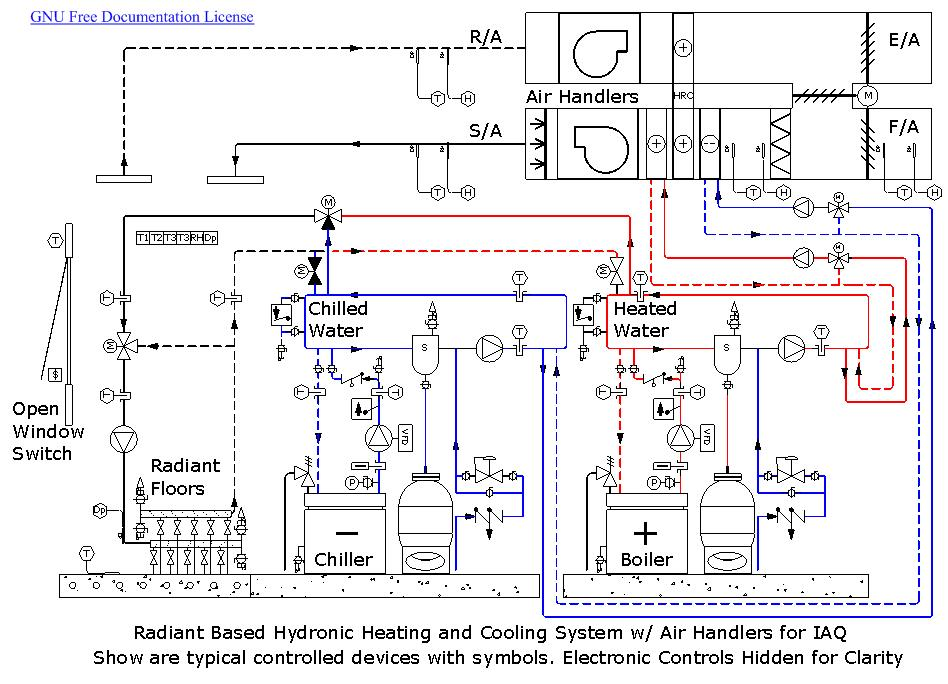
Symbols

== See also ==
- Aquastat
- Central heating
- Hydronic balancing
- Radiant cooling
- Radiant heating
- Uniform Mechanical Code
