= Kill A Watt =

Electricity usage monitor

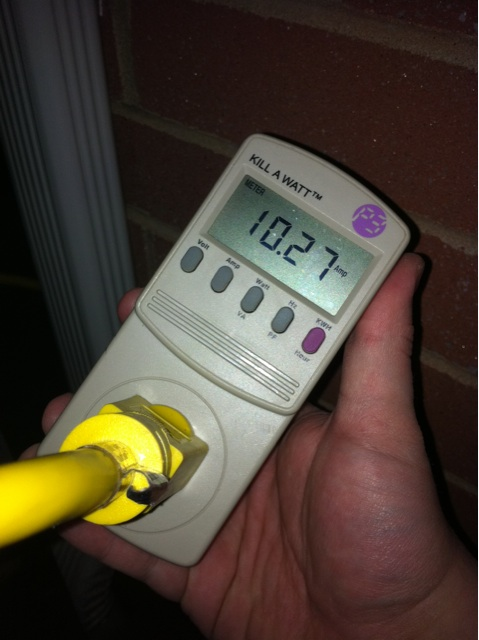
This Kill A Watt model P4400 is displaying a current draw of 10.27 Amperes in this mode.

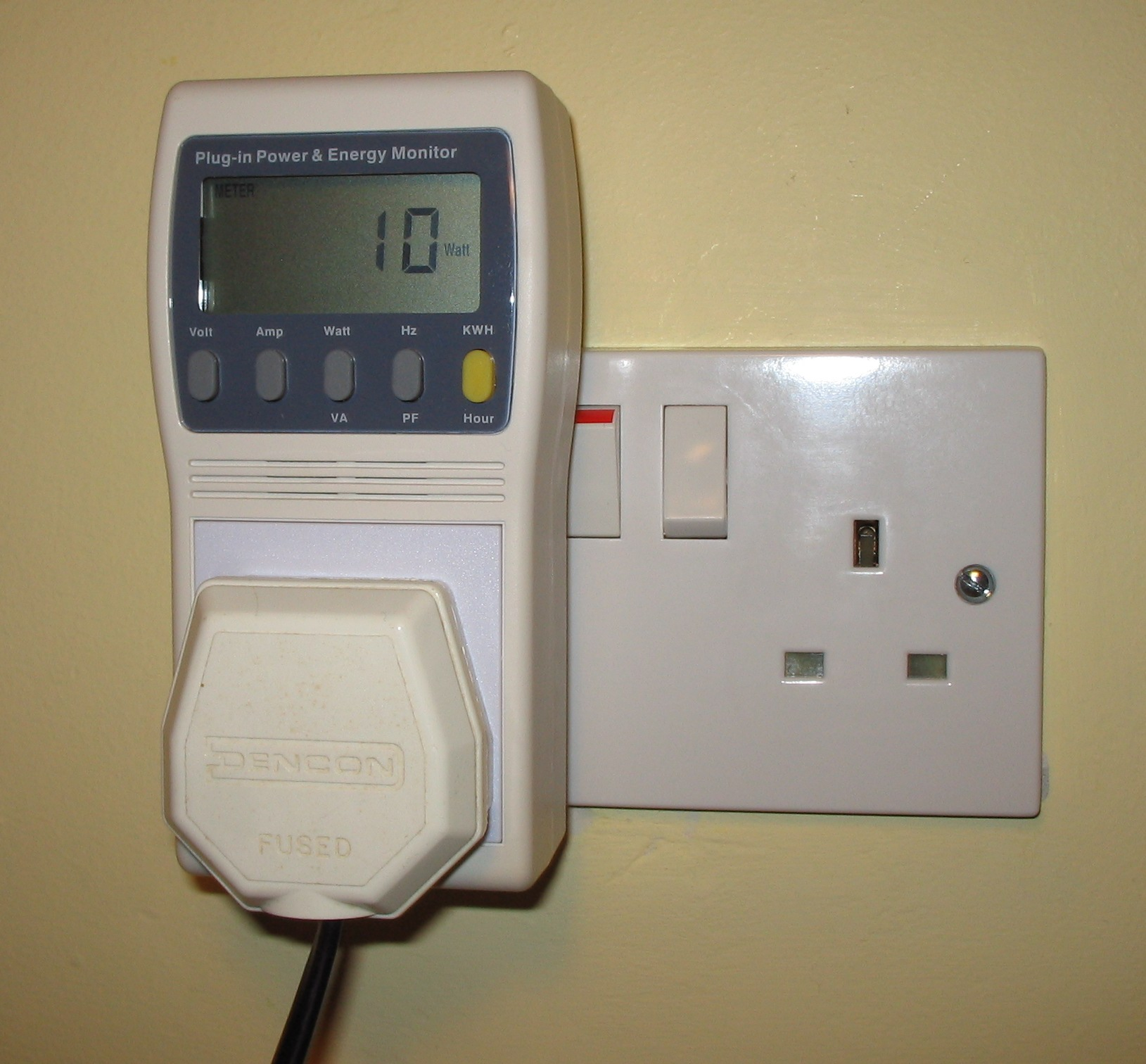
Prodigit Model 2000MU (UK version), shown in use and displaying a reading of 10 Watts being consumed by the appliance

The Kill A Watt (a pun on kilowatt) is an electricity usage monitor manufactured by Prodigit Electronics and sold by P3 International. It measures the energy used by devices plugged directly into the meter, as opposed to in-home energy use displays, which display the energy used by an entire household. The LCD shows voltage; current; true, reactive, and apparent power; power factor (for sinusoidal waveform); energy consumed in kWh; and hours connected. Some models display estimated cost.

Having a NEMA 5-15 plug and receptacle, and rated for 115 VAC (maximum 125 VAC), the Kill A Watt is sold for the North American market. The unit is manufactured by the Taiwanese company Prodigit, which also makes 230 VAC models of similar appearance and functionality for European Schuko, U.K. BS 1363 and Australian AS 3112 receptacles, and a model compatible with 100 VAC for the Japanese market (2022-04, marketed there as the Watt Checker [ワットチェッカー] Plus by other companies). The basic models support current up to 15 A, power up to 1,875 W (the 230 VAC equivalents also allow up to 15 A, corresponding to 3,750 W).

The device can give an indication of the standby power used by appliances.

== Models ==
There are several models of Kill A Watt meters:

=== P4400 ===
This is the original, most basic version, based on the Prodigit 2000M. From the time it is plugged in, it measures:

- Voltage (Volts)
- Current (Amperes)
- Power (Watts)
- Energy Used (Kilowatt-hours)
- Frequency (Hertz)
- Apparent power (Volt-amperes)
- Power factor
- Elapsed time

The power setting displays instantaneous power, and the kilowatt-hour setting displays energy consumed since last reset. When electricity is disconnected, the P4400's measurements and meters are reset. To reset Kill A Watt models that store values, press Volt and Amp together, or press the Reset key in some models.

=== P4460 Kill A Watt EZ ===
This is an enhanced version, based on the Prodigit 2022, which includes a backup battery to store measurements even when disconnected from electricity. It has the same capabilities as the P4400, and can be programmed with electricity cost information, which enables it to display the cost of the electricity consumed since reset. From this, it can calculate cost per hour, day, week, month, or year.

=== P4320 Kill A Watt PS ===
This model, based on the Prodigit 2024, is integrated into an eight-outlet power strip. Unlike the other models, it does not display frequency or apparent power. It protects against surges and EMI, has a configurable overcurrent shutdown limit, and also measures earth leakage current; one version acts as an earth leakage circuit breaker (ELCB). It switches power on or off at an AC zero crossing, minimizing current surges and interference.

== Variations ==
Although identical externally, there have been several different versions of the Kill A Watt and Prodigit equivalents, all essentially of the same design, but with different PCB layout, packaging, and components.

=== User modifications ===
One shortcoming of the Kill-a-Watt range of devices is that they do not have the ability to store, transmit or transfer the readings, thus limiting their usage for any ongoing monitoring purposes. To counter this shortcoming, a couple of openly available modifications have been published on the Web, to enable these devices send data wirelessly to a receiver.

A circuit diagram has been drawn up.

==== Tweet-a-watt ====
The Tweet-a-watt is a hacked version of the standard Kill-A-Watt Plug in Power Meter. By piggybacking on the device's on-board LM2902N op-amp chip, the creator was able to get readings for voltage and current and transmit to a computer, which then sent this to Twitter via handle @tweetawatt. At the time it gained quite a lot of interest on the Web, but interest waned after some time. The last tweet from this handle was in March 2010.

==== WattMote ====
Following the usefulness of the Tweet-a-Watt, designs for the WattMote were released on the Web by another hobbyist, Felix Rusu at LowPowerLab. The modifications use a customized clone of the Arduino chip known as the Moteino, making this version much cheaper, and requires much less soldering than the original design. Further optimizations on the design were done by Mike Tranchemontage, his designs featured a more robust power supply unit to the moteino chip, avoid problems capacitors which discharged too slowly with the original design.

==== Standby power ====
Most plug-in wattmeters are not useful for measuring standby power, also called vampire power if the device in standby is not doing anything useful such as being prepared to wake under timer control. Many meters only have a resolution of 1W when reading power; the Kill-a-Watts read down to 0.1W, but this is still too coarse for measuring low standby power. Modification to read standby power has been described and discussed in detail (with oscilloscope waveforms and measurements). Essentially, the meter's shunt resistor, used to generate a voltage proportional to load current, is replaced by a much larger value, typically 100 times larger, with protective diodes. Readings of the modified meter have to be divided by the resistance factor (e.g. 100), and maximum measurable power is reduced by the same factor.

== See also ==
- Home energy monitor
- Nonintrusive load monitoring
- Wattmeter
