= Compound meter =

Compound meter may refer to:

- Compound meter (water meter)
- Compound meter (music)
