= DIN 62056 =

DIN 62056 is a standard developed by the German Deutsches Institut für Normung (DIN) for electrical smart meters, initially published in 2002 in several parts. Most of the later parts published by the International Electrotechnical Commission are used to certify common electronic formats and transmission protocols from electrical readers for private households, industries and power generators over telephone lines or networks. These include transmission over HDLC and meter reading with the COSEM application layer.
