= Water metering =

Process of measuring water use

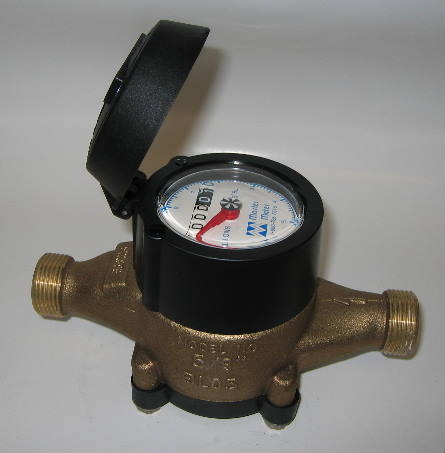
A typical residential water meter

Water metering is the practice of measuring water use. Water meters measure the volume of water used by residential and commercial building units that are supplied with water by a public water supply system. They are also used to determine flow through a particular portion of the system.

In most of the world water meters are calibrated in cubic metres (m^{3}) or litres, but in the United States and some other countries water meters are calibrated in cubic feet (ft^{3}) or US gallons on a mechanical or electronic register. Modern meters typically can display rate-of-flow in addition to total volume.

Several types of water meters are in common use, and may be characterized by the flow measurement method, the type of end-user, the required flow rates, and accuracy requirements.

Water metering is changing rapidly with the advent of smart metering technology and various innovations.

In North America, standards for manufacturing water meters are set by the American Water Works Association. Outside of North America, most countries use ISO standards.

== Types of metering technologies ==
There are two common approaches to flow measurement: displacement and velocity, each making use of a variety of technologies. Common displacement designs include oscillating piston and nutating disc meters. Velocity-based designs include single- and multi-jet meters and turbine meters.

There are also non-mechanical designs, for example, electromagnetic and ultrasonic meters, and meters designed for special uses. Most meters in a typical water distribution system are designed to measure cold potable water only. Specialty hot water meters are designed with materials that can withstand higher temperatures. Meters for reclaimed water have special lavender register covers to signify that the water should not be used for drinking.

Additionally, there are electromechanical meters, like prepaid water meters and automatic meter reading meters. The latter integrates an electronic measurement component and a LCD with a mechanical water meter. Mechanical water meters normally use a reed switch, hall or photoelectric coding register as the signal output. After processing by the microcontroller unit (MCU) in the electronic module, the data are transmitted to the LCD or output to an information management system.

Water meters are generally owned, read and maintained by a public water provider such as a city, rural water association or private water company. In some cases an owner of a mobile home park, apartment complex or commercial building may be billed by a utility based on the reading of one meter, with the costs shared among the tenants based on some sort of key (size of flat, number of inhabitants or by separately tracking the water consumption of each unit in what is called submetering).

=== Displacement water meters ===
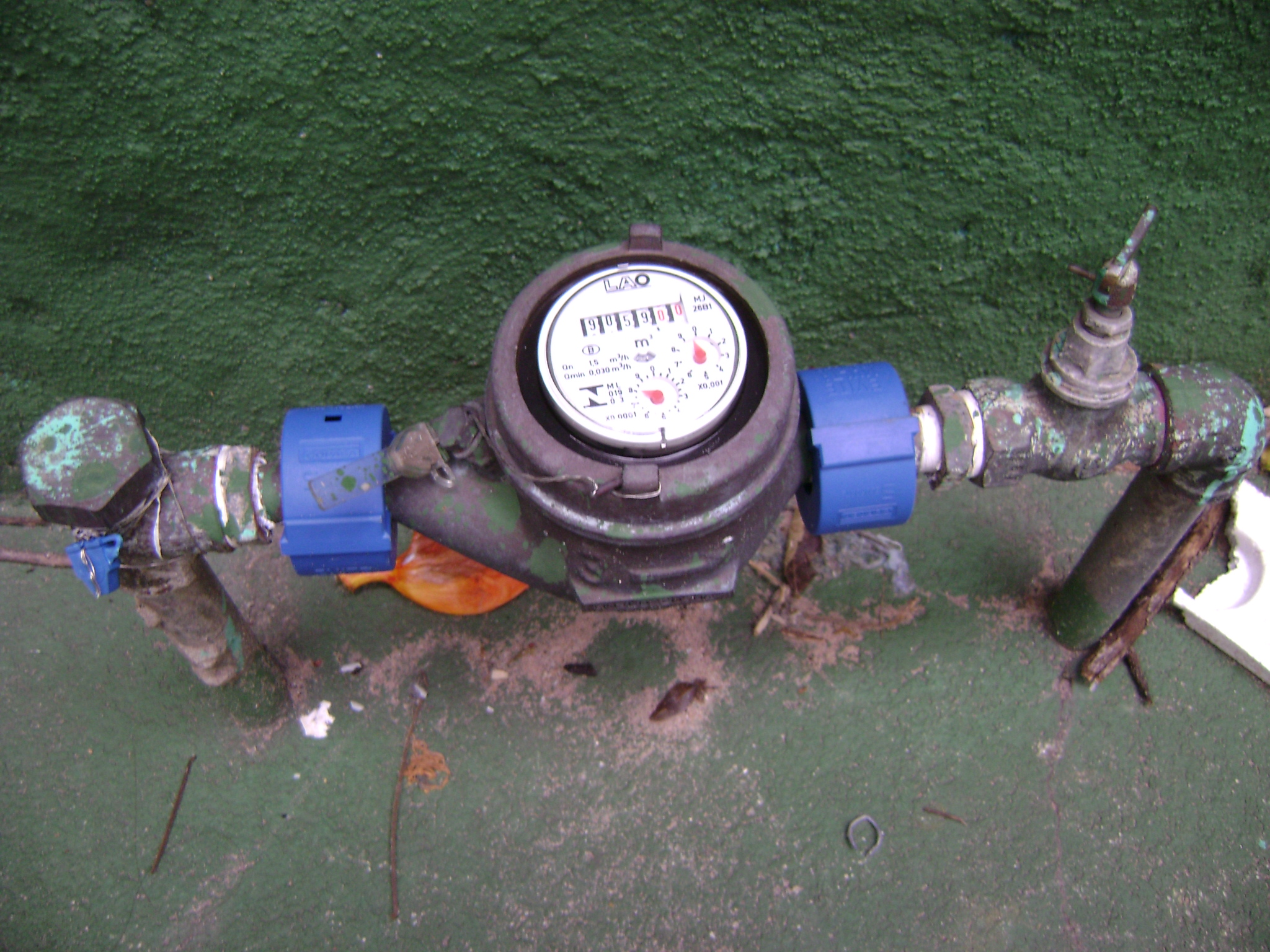
Water meter in Belo Horizonte

Displacement meters are commonly referred to as Positive Displacement, or "PD" meters. Two common types are oscillating piston meters and nutating disk meters. Either method relies on the water to physically displace the moving measuring element in direct proportion to the amount of water that passes through the meter. The piston or disk moves a magnet that drives the register.

PD meters are generally very accurate at the low-to-moderate flow rates typical of residential and small commercial users and commonly range in size from 5/8" to 2". Because displacement meters require that all water flows through the meter to "push" the measuring element, they generally are not practical in large commercial applications requiring high flow rates or low-pressure loss. PD meters normally have a built-in strainer to protect the measuring element from rocks or other debris that could stop or break the measuring element. PD meters normally have bronze, brass or plastic bodies with internal measuring chambers made of moulded plastics and stainless steel.

=== Velocity water meters ===
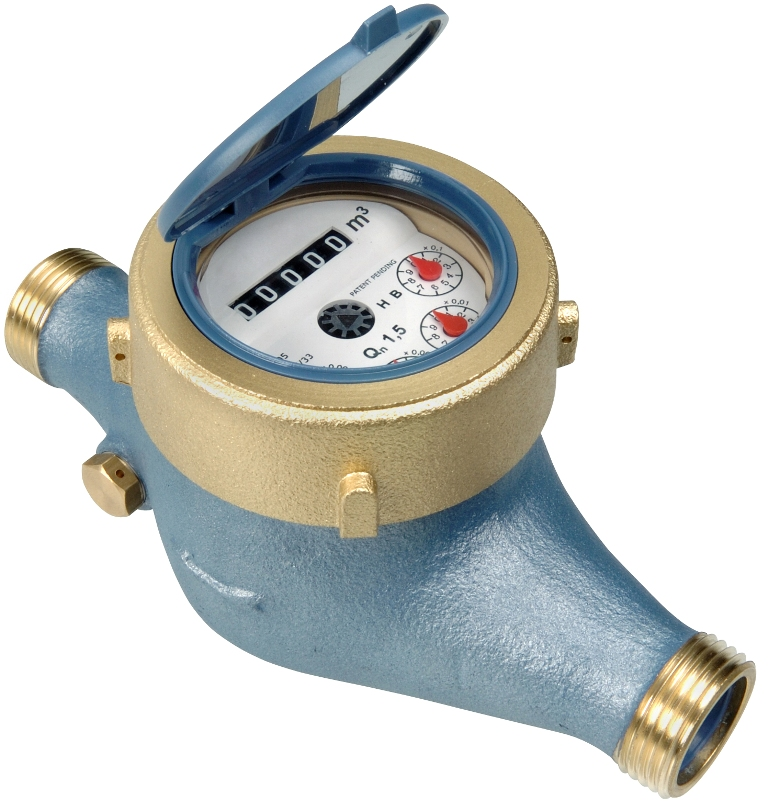
A velocity water meter

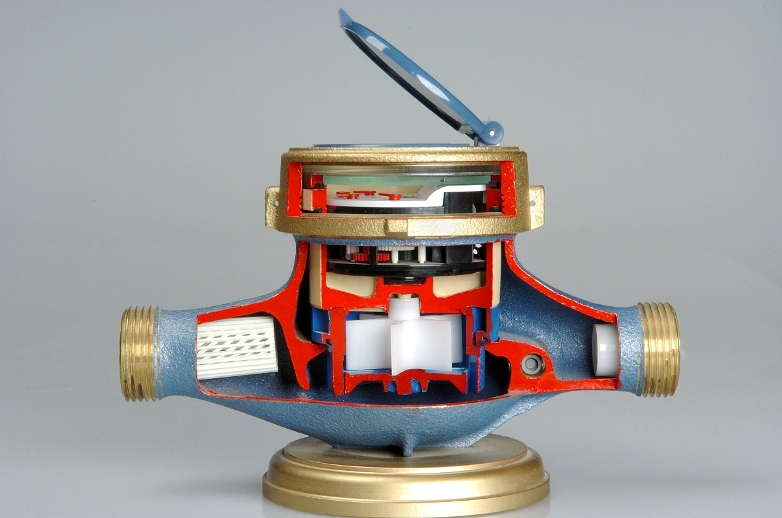
Internal structure of a velocity water meter

A velocity-type meter measures the velocity of flow through a meter of known internal capacity. The speed of the flow can then be converted into a volume of flow to determine the usage. There are several types of meters that measure water flow velocity, including jet meters (single-jet and multi-jet), turbine meters, propeller meters and mag meters. Most velocity-based meters have an adjustment vane for calibrating the meter to the required accuracy.

==== Multi-jet meters ====
Multi-jet meters are very accurate in small sizes and are commonly used in 5/8 in (16 mm) to 2 in (51 mm) sizes for residential and small commercial users. Multi-jet meters use multiple ports surrounding an internal chamber to create multiple jets of water against a turbine, whose rotation speed depends on the velocity of water flow. Multi-jets are very accurate at low flow rates, but there are no large size meters since they do not have the straight-through flow path needed for the high flow rates used in large pipe diameters. Multi-jet meters generally have an internal strainer element that can protect the jet ports from getting clogged. Multi-jet meters normally have bronze alloy bodies or outer casings, with internal measuring parts made from modern thermoplastics and stainless steel.

==== Turbine meters ====
Turbine meters are less accurate than displacement and jet meters at low flow rates, but the measuring element does not occupy or severely restrict the entire path of flow. The flow direction is generally straight through the meter, allowing for higher flow rates and less pressure loss than displacement-type meters. They are the meter of choice for large commercial users, fire protection and as master meters for the water distribution system. Strainers are generally required to be installed in front of the meter to protect the measuring element from gravel or other debris that could enter the water distribution system. Turbine meters are generally available for 1 1/2 in (38 mm) to 12 in (300 mm) or higher pipe sizes. Turbine meter bodies are commonly made of bronze, cast iron or ductile iron. Internal turbine elements can be plastic or non-corrosive metal alloys. They are accurate in normal working conditions but are greatly affected by the flow profile and fluid conditions.

- Fire meters are a specialized type of turbine meter meeting the high flow rates requirements for fire protection. They are often approved by Underwriters Laboratories (UL) or Factory Mutual (FM) for use in fire protection.
- Fire hydrant meters are a specialized type of portable turbine meter attached to a fire hydrant to measure water flowing out of the hydrant. The meters are normally made of aluminium to keep their weight low and usually have a 3 in (76 mm) capacity. Utilities often require them for measuring water used on construction sites, for pool filling, or where a permanent meter has not yet been installed.

==== Compound meters ====
A compound meter is used where high flow rates are necessary, but where at times there are also smaller rates of flow that need to be accurately measured. Compound meters have two measuring elements and a check valve to regulate flow between them. At high flow rates, water is normally diverted primarily or completely to the high flow element. The high flow element is typically a turbine meter. When flow rates drop to where the high flow element cannot measure accurately, a check valve closes to divert water to a smaller element that can measure the lower flow rates accurately. The low flow element is typically a multi-jet or PD meter. By adding the values registered by the high and low elements, the utility has a record of the total consumption of water flowing through the meter.

==== Electromagnetic meters ====
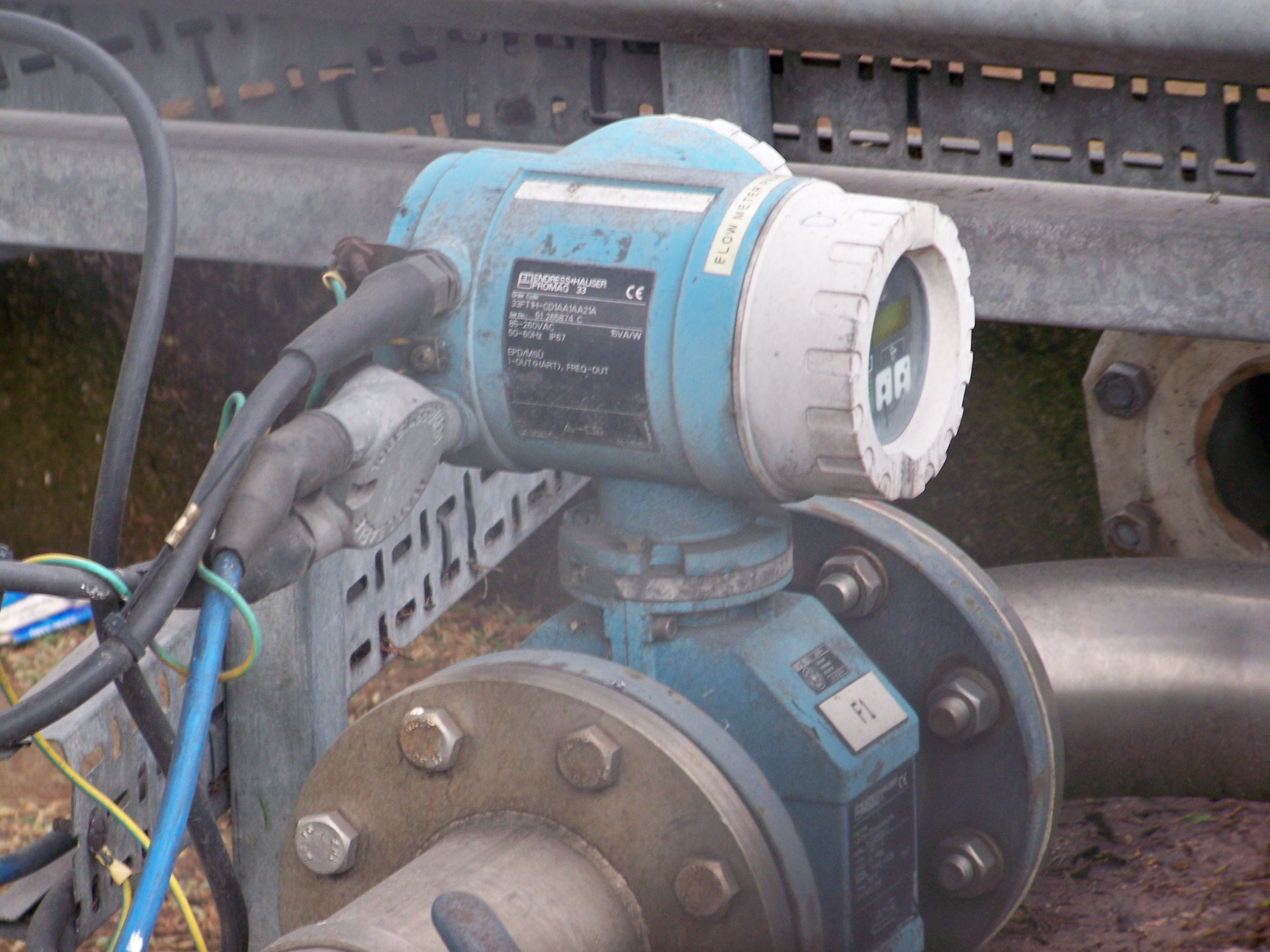
Electromagnetic flow meter

Magnetic flow meters, commonly referred to as "mag meters", are technically a velocity-type water meter, except that they use electromagnetic properties to determine the water flow velocity, rather than the mechanical means used by jet and turbine meters. Mag meters use the physics principle of Faraday's law of induction for measurement and require AC or DC electricity from a power line or battery to operate the electromagnets. Since mag meters have no mechanical measuring element, they normally have the advantage of being able to measure flow in either direction, and use electronics for measuring and totalizing the flow. Mag meters can also be useful for measuring raw (untreated/unfiltered) water and waste-water since there is no mechanical measuring element to get clogged or damaged by debris flowing through the meter. Strainers are not required with mag meters since there is no measuring element in the stream of flow that could be damaged. Since stray electrical energy flowing through the flow tube can cause inaccurate readings, most mag meters are installed with either grounding rings or grounding electrodes to divert stray electricity away from the electrodes used to measure the flow inside the flow tube.

==== Ultrasonic meters ====
Ultrasonic water meters use one or more ultrasonic transducer to send ultrasonic sound waves through the fluid to determine the velocity of the water. Since the cross-sectional area of the meter body is a fixed and known value, when the velocity of water is detected, the volume of water passing through the meter can be calculated with very high accuracy. Because of water density changes with temperature, most ultrasonic water meters also measure the water temperature as a component of the volume calculation.

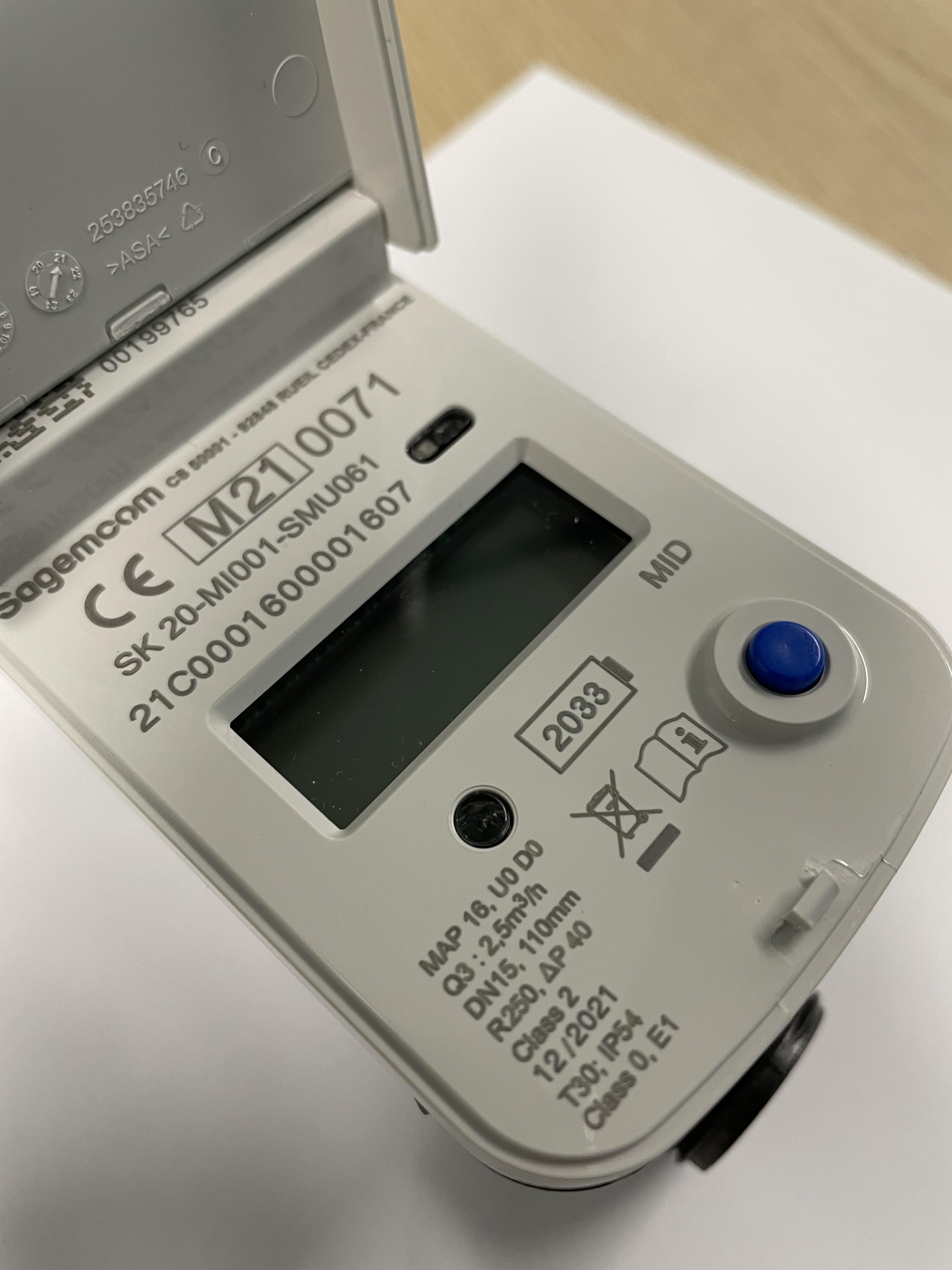
WMBUS Water Meter for submetering

There are 2 primary ultrasonic measurement technologies used in water metering:

- Doppler effect meters which utilize the Doppler Effect to determine the velocity of water passing through the meter.
- Transit Time meters which measure the amount of time required for the ultrasonic signal to pass between 2 or more fixed points inside the meter.

Ultrasonic meters may either be of flow-through or "clamp-on" design. Flow-through designs are those where the water passes directly through the meter, and are typically found in residential or commercial applications. Clamp-on designs are generally used for larger diameters where the sensors are mounted to the exterior of pipes, etc.

Ultrasonic water meters are highly accurate devices, with residential models capable of measuring flow rates as low as 1 liter per hour (L/h). They feature wide flow measurement ranges, require minimal maintenance, and have long lifespans due to the absence of internal mechanical components that could wear out over time. This design ensures stable long-term operation and reduces the need for maintenance.

Although relatively new to some markets, including the American water utility sector, ultrasonic water meters have been well-established in Europe, Asia, and other regions. Their growing popularity is driven by the increasing demand for reliable, low-maintenance, and durable metering solutions suitable for diverse climates and water supply conditions.

Furthermore, the integration of smart meter technology with ultrasonic systems is accelerating their adoption worldwide, as utility providers seek more efficient and accurate data collection methods.

==== Coriolis Water Meter ====
A Coriolis water meter is a precision instrument used to measure the mass flow rate and density of fluids, including water, by utilizing the Coriolis effect. Unlike traditional mechanical meters with moving parts, Coriolis meters use oscillating tubes through which the fluid flows. As the fluid passes through the tubes, it induces a phase shift in the oscillation, which is detected by sensors and is directly proportional to the mass flow rate.

Additionally, the meter can determine the fluid's density by analyzing the natural frequency of the oscillating tubes. This dual measurement capability provides high accuracy and reliability, making Coriolis meters particularly suitable for industrial applications requiring precise flow measurements. In addition, "Coriolis meters have a wide, dynamic range due to the linear nature of the signal created while measuring flow." However, their high cost often limits their use in residential or municipal water metering.

== Water Meter Length and Diameter ==
The dimensions of water meters, including tube length and diameter, are standardized to ensure compatibility with plumbing systems and compliance with regulatory frameworks. These dimensions are typically defined in terms of nominal pipe size (NPS) in the United States and nominal diameter (DN) in Europe, with corresponding measurements in inches and millimeters, respectively. Installation lengths are also standardized, differing between the United States and Europe to ensure interchangeability within regional plumbing systems.

=== Diameter ===
Water meter diameters are standardized based on expected flow rates and usage scenarios, with regional differences in specifications:

- United States: Diameters are specified in nominal pipe size (NPS), measured in inches. Common sizes include:

- Residential meters: 5/8 inch (commonly referred to as "5/8 x 3/4 inch"), 3/4 inch, and 1 inch.
- Commercial/Industrial meters: Sizes range from 1½ inches to 12 inches or larger, depending on flow requirements and system design.

- Europe: Diameters are defined in nominal diameter (DN), measured in millimeters. Common sizes include:

- Residential meters: DN15 (15 mm), DN20 (20 mm), and DN25 (25 mm).

- Commercial/Industrial meters: DN40 (40 mm) to DN300 (300 mm), with larger sizes available for high-capacity systems.

=== Length ===
The installation length (distance between the connection points) of a water meter varies between regions:

- United States:

- Residential meters: Standard lengths are 7½ inches, 9 inches, or 12 inches, as specified by the American Water Works Association (AWWA) Standard C700.

- Europe:

- Residential meters: Standard lengths include 110 mm, 165 mm, and 190 mm, conforming to ISO 4064 standards.

- Commercial/Industrial meters: In both regions, larger meters often have lengths exceeding 300 mm (12 inches), with exact dimensions tailored to the application and local plumbing requirements.

== Water meter index Display ==
=== Registers ===
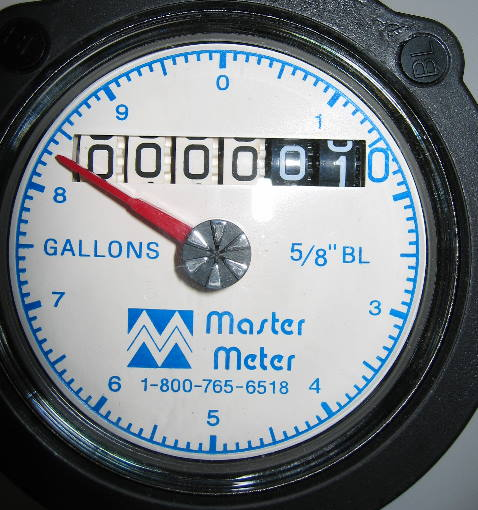
A typical water meter register showing a meter reading of 8.3 gallons. Notice the black "1" on the odometer has not yet fully turned over, so only the red hand is read.

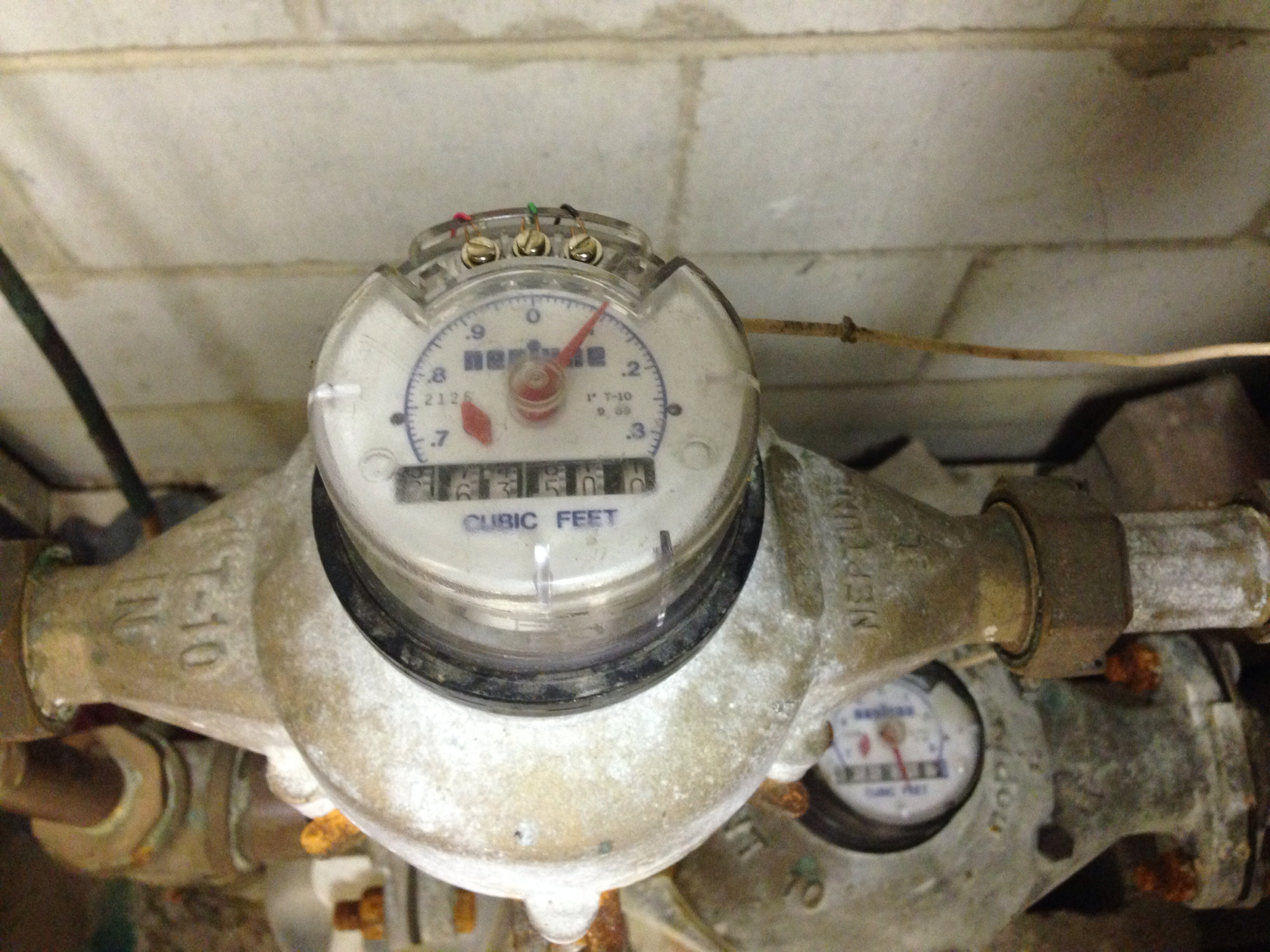
Water meters connected to remote reading devices through three-wire cables

There are several types of registers on water meters. A standard register normally has a dial similar to a clock, with gradations around the perimeter to indicate the measuring unit and the amount of water used, if less than the lowest digit in a display similar to the odometer wheels in a car, their sum is the total volume used. Modern registers are normally driven by a magnetic coupling between a magnet in the measuring chamber attached to the measuring element and another attached to the bottom of the register. Gears in the register convert the motion of the measuring element to the proper usage increment for display on the sweep hand and the odometer-style wheels. Many registers also have a leak detector. This is a small visible disk or hand that is geared closer to the rotation speed of the drive magnet, so that very small flows that would be visually undetectable on the regular sweep hand can be seen.

With Automatic Meter Reading, manufacturers have developed pulse or encoder registers to produce electronic output for radio transmitters, reading storage devices, and data logging devices. Pulse meters send a digital or analog electronic pulse to a recording device. Encoder registers have an electronic means permitting an external device to interrogate the register to obtain either the position of the wheels or a stored electronic reading. Frequent transmissions of consumption data can be used to give smart meter functionality.

=== LCD ===
There are also some specialized types of registers such as meters with an LCD instead of mechanical wheels, and registers to output data or pulses to a variety of recording and controller devices. For industrial applications, the output is often 4-20 mA analog for recording or controlling different flow rates in addition to totalization.

=== Water meter reading ===
Different size meters indicate different resolutions of the reading. One rotation of the sweep hand may be equivalent to 10 gallons or to 1,000 gallons (1 to 100 ft^{3}, 0.1 to 10 m^{3}). If one rotation of the hand represents 10 gallons, the meter has a 10-gallon sweep. Sometimes the last number(s) of the wheel display are non-rotating or printed on the dial face. The fixed zero number(s) are represented by the position of the rotating sweep hand. For example, if one rotation of the hand is 10 gallons, the sweep hand is on 7, and the wheel display shows 123456 plus a fixed zero, the actual total usage would be 1,234,567 gallons.

In the United States most utilities bill only to the nearest 100 or 1,000 gallons (10 to 100 ft^{3}, 1 to 10 m^{3}), and often only read the leftmost 4 or 5 numbers on the display wheels. Using the above example, they would read and bill 1,234, rounding to 1,234,000 gallons based on a 1,000-gallon billing resolution. The most common rounding for a particular size meter is often indicated by differently coloured number wheels, the ones ignored being black, and the ones used for billing being white.

== Water meter smart metering technologies and usage ==
Smart metering technologies for water meters refer to advanced systems that enable real-time monitoring, data collection, and analysis of water usage through digital and connected devices. Unlike traditional mechanical water meters, smart meters are equipped with electronic components that measure water flow and transmit the data wirelessly to utilities and consumers. Key technologies include Automated Meter Reading (AMR), which provides one-way communication to collect usage data, and Advanced Metering Infrastructure (AMI), which supports two-way communication for enhanced features such as remote monitoring, leak detection, and dynamic billing. Smart water meters are integrated with Internet of Things (IoT) platforms, allowing for more efficient water management, reduced waste, and improved customer engagement.

=== RF Technologies and Protocols ===
Radio Frequency (RF) technologies form the backbone of smart metering systems by enabling wireless communication between meters and utility networks. Several RF technologies and protocols are widely used in smart water metering:

- Wireless M-Bus (WMBus): WMBus, compliant with the European EN 13757 standard, is widely adopted across Europe for water, gas, and electricity metering. It offers secure, reliable, and energy-efficient communication tailored for utility applications. The data collected by this mean are sent to the network using a WMUS Gateway (see below).
- Wize technology: A protocol based on the 169 MHz frequency band, WIZE is designed for long-range, low-power communication. It is commonly used in Europe for water and gas metering due to its excellent signal penetration and scalability.
- LoRaWAN: LoRaWAN is valued for its long-range and low-power capabilities, making it suitable for large-scale deployments in both rural and urban settings. It is widely used in industrial and municipal applications.
- Zigbee: Known for its ability to create mesh networks, Zigbee is often used in urban environments where dense connectivity is required. It is energy-efficient and supports secure communication.
- NB-IoT and Cat-M: Narrowband Internet of Things (NB-IoT) and LTE Cat-M are cellular-based technologies that enable direct communication with cellular networks. These protocols are particularly suitable for large-scale deployments in areas with existing cellular infrastructure, offering extended battery life and robust coverage.
- Encoder receiver transmitter (ERT) technology is a widely used communication system in utility metering, particularly in the United States. Water meters are connected through a cable to an external unit called Meter Interface Unit (MIU) and gives the ability to transition between wired and wireless systems have made it a popular choice for utility providers seeking efficient and scalable metering solutions.

=== Application-Layer Protocols in Smart Metering ===
Application-layer protocols operating above RF communication technologies to standardize data exchange, ensure interoperability, and enhance device functionality. These protocols enable integration of meters into broader utility and Internet of Things (IoT) ecosystems.

DLMS/COSEM (Device Language Message Specification/Companion Specification for Energy Metering) is one of the most widely adopted protocols in smart metering. It provides a flexible and standardized framework for data exchange between metering devices and utility systems. The protocol supports various communication technologies, including RF, wired, and cellular networks, and facilitates secure data transfer, structured data management, and remote monitoring.

LwM2M (Lightweight Machine to Machine) is a protocol specifically designed for IoT devices, offering efficient resource management and secure communication over constrained networks. Its lightweight design makes it ideal for smart water meters and other low-power devices. LwM2M supports remote configuration, firmware updates, and real-time monitoring, enabling enhanced functionality and scalability in metering systems.

Other application-layer protocols, such as MQTT (Message Queuing Telemetry Transport) and CoAP (Constrained Application Protocol), are also utilized in smart metering systems, particularly in IoT-centric deployments. These protocols focus on low-bandwidth, high-efficiency communication, ensuring reliable data exchange in diverse environments.

=== Smart Water Metering System: Infrastructure Overview ===
A smart water metering system integrates advanced water meters, communication networks, and centralized platforms like the Head-End System (HES) and Meter Data Management System (MDMS). Smart meters collect data on water usage, pressure, and anomalies, transmitting it through wireless networks. The HES aggregates and validates this data, forwarding it to the MDMS, which performs advanced analytics, trend reporting, and billing integration.

==== WMBUS Gateway for Water Meter Remote Reading ====
A WMBUS Gateway (Wireless M-Bus Gateway) is a communication device that enables remote reading of water meters by bridging the gap between the water meters equipped with Wireless M-Bus communication modules and centralized data collection systems. The gateway typically operates on standard frequencies such as 868 MHz (Europe) or other ISM bands.

WMBUS gateways can be deployed as fixed gateways, installed at permanent locations to continuously collect data from meters within range, or as part of mobile solutions, such as drive-by or walk-by systems, where data is collected via handheld devices or vehicles equipped with receivers as they pass by the meters.

In some cases, electricity meters with integrated communication modules are also utilized as fixed gateways to collect data from nearby water and gas meters, leveraging their existing infrastructure to minimize deployment costs.

The collected data is then transmitted to a central server via technologies like GSM, GPRS, LTE, or Ethernet for analysis and management.

=== Applications and Benefits ===
The adoption of these RF technologies and protocols enables seamless integration of smart water meters into utility systems, offering several advantages:

- Improved Efficiency: Automated data collection reduces manual labor and errors.
- Enhanced Leak Detection: Real-time monitoring helps identify and address leaks promptly.
- Dynamic Billing: Enables more accurate and flexible billing based on real-time usage.
- Sustainability: Supports water conservation by providing detailed consumption insights.

== Prevalence ==
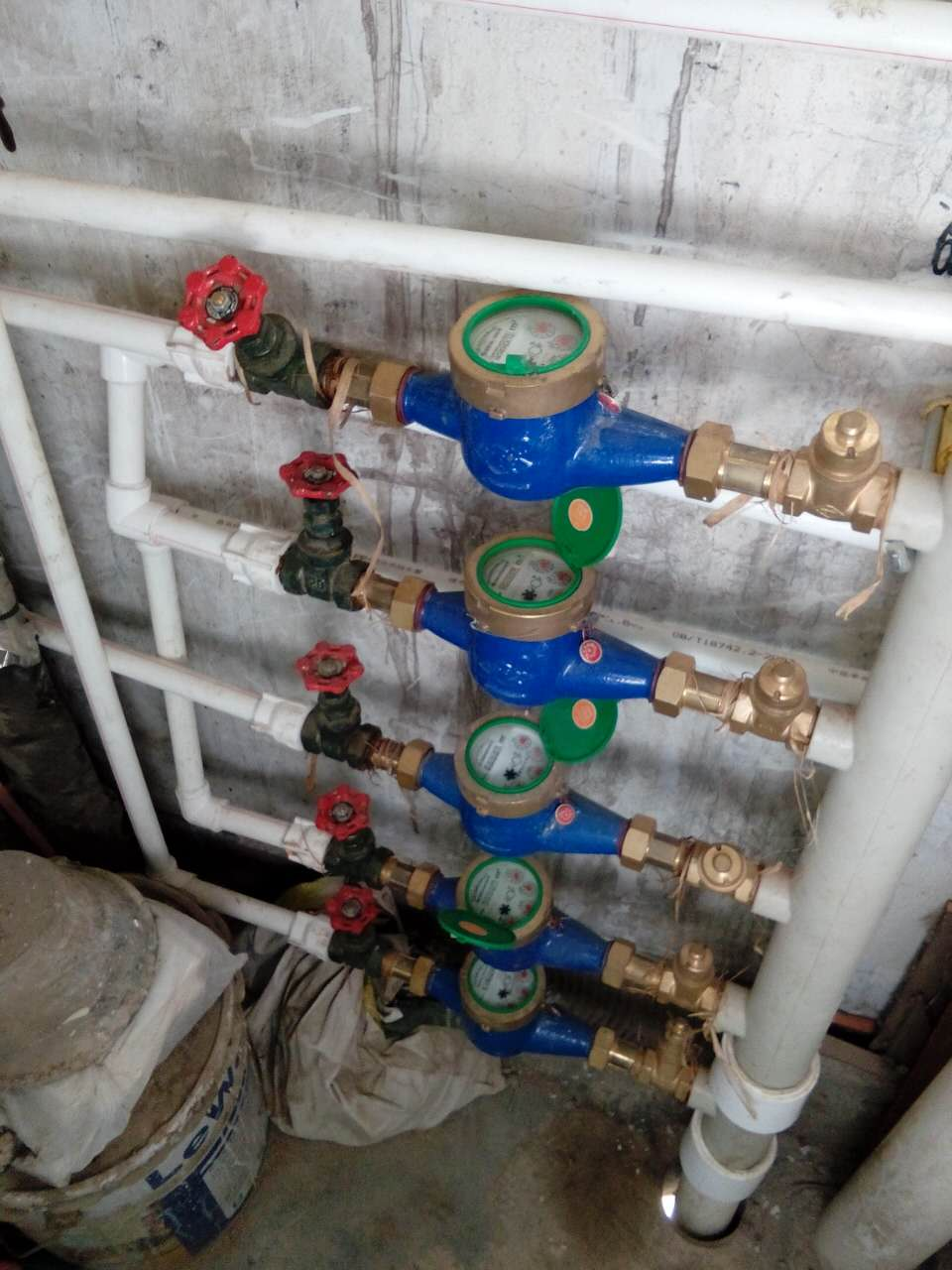
Bank of water meters in building

Water metering is common for residential and commercial drinking water supply in many countries, as well as for industrial self-supply with water. However, it is less common in irrigated agriculture, which is the major water user worldwide. Water metering is also uncommon for piped drinking water supply in rural areas and small towns, although there are examples of successful metering in rural areas in developing countries, such as in El Salvador.

Metering of water supplied by utilities to residential, commercial and industrial users is common in most developed countries, except for the United Kingdom where only about 52% of users are metered. In some developing countries metering is very common, such as in Chile where it stands at 96%, while in others it still remains low, such as in Argentina.

The percentage of residential water metering in selected cities in developing countries is as follows:

- 99% in Santiago de Chile (1998)
- 96% in Abidjan, Ivory Coast (1987)
- 62% in cities in Guatemala (2000)
- 30% in Lima, Peru (1991)
- 28% in Kathmandu, Nepal (2001)
- 2% in Buenos Aires, Argentina (1992)

Nearly two-thirds of OECD countries meter more than 90% of single-family houses. A few are also expanding their metering of apartments (e.g., France and Germany).

== Benefits ==
The benefits of metering are that:

- in conjunction with volumetric pricing it provides an incentive for water conservation,
- it helps to detect water leaks in the distribution network, thus providing a basis for reducing the amount of non-revenue water;
- it is a precondition for quantity-targeting of water subsidies to the poor.

== Costs ==
The costs of metering include:

- Investment costs to purchase, install and replace meters,
- Recurring costs to read meters and issue bills based on consumption instead of bills based on monthly flat fees.

While the cost of purchasing residential meters is low, the total life cycle costs of metering are high. For example, retrofitting flats in large buildings with meters for every flat can involve major and thus costly plumbing work.

== Problems ==
Problems associated with metering arise particularly in the case of intermittent supply, which is common in many developing countries. Sudden changes in pressure can damage meters to the extent that many meters in cities in developing countries are not functional. Also, some types of meters become less accurate as they age, and under-registering consumption leads to lower revenues if defective meters are not regularly replaced. Many types of meters also register air flows, which can lead to over-registration of consumption, especially in systems with intermittent supply, when water supply is re-established and the incoming water pushes air through the meters.

Displacement Water meters do not distinguish between air and water, both are counted as fluid. There are two regulations where water companies and meter manufacturers do not comply and charge air for water. A measuring system shall be equipped with an effective air/vapor eliminator or other automatic means to prevent the passage of air/vapor through the meter. ref.[Handbook 44 – 2019 3.30. S.2.1.] Measuring systems shall incorporate a gas elimination device for the proper elimination of any air or undissolved gases which may be contained in the liquid before it enters the meter.

== Water meter standards and certification ==
=== Water meter Measurement standards and certification ===
Water meters are subject to measurement standards and certifications to ensure their accuracy, reliability, and compliance with regulatory requirements. The most widely recognized standards include the ISO 4064 series and the OIML R49 standards, which define the performance, accuracy classes, and testing procedures for water meters.

In the European Union, compliance with the Measuring Instruments Directive (MID) is mandatory for water meters sold within member states, ensuring conformity with harmonized European standards.

In the United States, water meters typically adhere to the AWWA (American Water Works Association) C700 series standards, which specify design, materials, and performance criteria.

In Australia and New Zealand, water meters must comply with the AS 3565 standard.

Certification processes for water meters often include testing for

- accuracy under varying flow rates,
- durability under environmental stress,
- and long-term stability.

=== Water meter potability standards and certification ===
Water meters used in potable water systems are required to meet stringent standards to ensure they do not contaminate the water supply or alter its quality. These standards address materials, coatings, and designs that come into contact with drinking water.

In the United States, compliance with NSF/ANSI 61 is mandatory, setting limits on leachable contaminants from water system components.

The European Union mandates conformity with the Regulation (EU) 305/2011 (Construction Products Regulation), alongside national certifications like

- United Kingdom: WRAS Approval,
- Germany: KTW Guideline,
- France: ACS Certification (Attestation de Conformité Sanitaire),
- Italy: DM 174/2004

In Australia and New Zealand, the AS/NZS 4020 standard governs the suitability of products for use with potable water, focusing on factors such as taste, color, and toxicity.

In Latin America, countries like Brazil and Mexico often reference international standards such as those from NSF International.

== Environmental constraints ==
Water meters are frequently installed in environments where they are exposed to rain, flooding, and dust, necessitating robust protection to maintain accurate and reliable operation. An IP68 rating indicates that a device is completely dust-tight and can withstand continuous immersion in water beyond 1 meter depth, as specified by the manufacturer.

To achieve such protection, manufacturers employ various ingress protection mechanisms:

- Potting with Epoxy or Silicone Gel: Encapsulating electronic components in materials like epoxy resin or silicone gel provides a robust barrier against water ingress. Epoxy offers strong adhesion and durability, while silicone gel provides flexibility and thermal stability.
- Sealing and Desiccants for Humidity Control: Incorporating desiccants within the meter's enclosure helps absorb moisture, maintaining low humidity levels and preventing condensation that could lead to corrosion or electrical failures.
- Vents to prevent condensing humidity

== Innovation in water metering ==
=== Additional sensor ===
Additional sensors integrated into water meters are being explored as part of proof-of-concept (PoC) projects to enhance functionality and provide more detailed insights into water usage and system performance.

These innovations aim to address challenges such as leak detection, water quality monitoring, and reverse flow detection.

For instance,

- Pressure sensors are being tested to identify anomalies like pipe bursts or blockages,
- Temperature sensors are evaluated for their ability to detect freezing risks or thermal variations in water supply systems.
- Acoustic sensors are tested in PoC systems for leak detection by analyzing sound patterns and vibrations within pipes.

=== Data analytics ===
The data collected by the smart meters is analyzed to provide insights into water usage patterns, peak consumption times, and potential issues like leaks or inefficiencies in the system. Utilities can use this data to optimize water distribution and address problems proactively.

=== Leak Detection ===
The usage data can be analyzed on device to determine if there is a leak occurring within the building that is being monitored. The most common leak detection algorithm is to look for 24 hours of constant usage. This algorithm works well for residential buildings but has issues with larger commercial buildings where there can be varying levels of constant usage throughout a day without a leak.

== Effect on consumption ==
There is disagreement as to the effect of metering and water pricing on water consumption. The price elasticity of metered water demand varies greatly depending on local conditions. The effect of volumetric water pricing on consumption tends to be higher if the water bill represents a significant portion of household expenditures.

There is evidence from the UK that there is an instant drop in consumption of some 10% when meters are installed, although in most instances consumption is not directly measured prior to meter installation, so the benefits are uncertain. Whilst metered water users in the UK do use less than unmetered users, in most areas metering is not compulsory for homes built before 1990, so the metered customers are to some extent a self-selecting group. There is also concern that water metering could be socially regressive, as householders on low incomes are less able to invest in water efficiency measures and may experience water poverty (defined as when a household spends more than 3% of net income on water and sewage services).

In Hamburg, Germany, domestic water consumption for metered flats (112 liter/capita/day) was 18% lower than for unmetered flats (137 liter/capita/day) in 1992.

== Calibration and verification bench ==
Water meter calibration and testing benches employ various methods to evaluate the accuracy and performance of water meters. Each method caters to specific testing requirements, such as flow range, precision, or scalability. Once the water flow is controlled, various measurement methods are employed to assess the performance and accuracy of water meters. These methods focus on comparing the meter's readings to a reference standard

- Start-Stop Method

A basic and widely used approach where the flow is initiated and stopped over a fixed period or volume. The meter's reading is compared against a precisely measured reference volume, offering reliable results for low to medium flow rates.

- Gravimetric Method:

This method involves collecting the fluid over a known period, typically 60s and measuring its mass using high precision weighing scales.

- Volume Comparator Method

This method uses a calibrated reference device, such as a piston prover or master meter, to compare the water volume measured by the test meter. It is highly precise and suitable for meters requiring strict compliance with standards.

- Real-Time Dynamic Measurement

Continuous flow systems use real-time data acquisition to monitor and compare the meter's readings with those from a calibrated sensor. This modern method enables fast and efficient testing, especially for high-volume operations.

== Prepaid and Postpaid water meters ==
Meters can be prepaid or postpaid, depending on the payment method. Most mechanical type water meters are of the postpaid type, as are electromagnetic and ultrasonic meters. With prepaid water meters, the user purchases and prepays for a given amount of water from a vending station. The amount of water credited is entered on media such as an IC or RF type card. The main difference is whether the card needs contact with the processing part of the prepaid water meter. In some areas, a prepaid water meter uses a keypad as the interface for inputting the water credit.

== Main suppliers ==
- Sagemcom
- Kamstrup
- DH Metering Europe
- Honeywell / Elster (ex Kent, ex Magnol, ex Wateau/Wameter)
- Farnier
- Hydrometer
- Itron (ex Actaris, ex Schlumberger, ex Compagnie des Compteurs ou CDC),
- Maddalena
- Smarteo Water (ex Polier Water)
- Sappel et Hydrometer (groupe Diehl)
- Sensus (ex Sensus Metering Systems, ex Invensys, ex Socam)
- Tagus
- Zenner
- Arad

== See also ==
- Advanced metering infrastructure
- American Water Works Association
- Automated meter reading
- Curb box
- Drinking water
- Electricity meter
- Flow measurement
- Gas meter
- Meter data management
- Public utility
- Residential water use
- Utility submeter
- Water conservation
