= Meter data management =

Meter data management (MDM) refers to software that performs long-term data storage and management for the vast quantities of data delivered by smart metering systems. This data consists primarily of usage data and events that are imported from the head-end servers managing the data collection in advanced metering infrastructure (AMI) or automatic meter reading (AMR) systems. MDM is a component in the smart grid infrastructure promoted by utility companies. This may also incorporate meter data analytics, the analysis of data emitted by electric smart meters that record consumption of electric energy.

== MDM systems ==
An MDM system will typically import the data, then validate, cleanse and process it before making it available for billing and analysis.

Products for meter data include:

- Smart meter deployment planning and management;
- Meter and network asset monitoring and management;
- Automated smart meter provisioning (i.e. addition, deletion and updating of meter information at utility and AMR side) and billing cutover;
- Meter-to-cash system, workforce management system, asset management and other systems.

Furthermore, an MDM may provide reporting capabilities for load and demand forecasting, management reports, and customer service metrics.

An MDM provide application programming interfaces (APIs) between the MDM and the multiple destinations that rely on meter data. This is the first step to ensure that consistent processes and 'understanding' get applied to the data. Besides this common functionality, an advanced MDM may provide facility for remote connect/disconnect of meters, power status verification/power restoration verification and on demand read of remote meters.

== Data analysis ==
Smart meters send usage data to the central head end systems as often as every minute from each meter whether installed at a residential or a commercial or an industrial customer. Utility companies sometimes analyze this voluminous data as well as collect it. Some of the reasons for analysis are

1. to make efficient energy buying decisions based on the usage patterns,
2. launching energy efficiency or energy rebate programs,
3. energy theft detection,
4. comparing and correcting metering service provider performance, and
5. detecting and reducing unbilled energy.

This data not only helps utility companies make their businesses more efficient, but also helps consumers save money by using less energy at peak times. So, it is both economical and green. Smart meter infrastructure is fairly new to Utilities industry. As utility companies collect more and more data over the years, they may uncover further uses to these detailed smart meter activities. Similar analysis can be applied to water and gas as well as electric usage.

According to a 2012 web posting, data that is required for complete meter data analytics may not reside in the same database. Instead, it might reside in disparate databases among various departments of utility companies.

== See also ==
- Automatic meter reading
- Advanced metering infrastructure
- Smart grid
- Smart meter
