= Smart meter =

Online recorder of utility usage

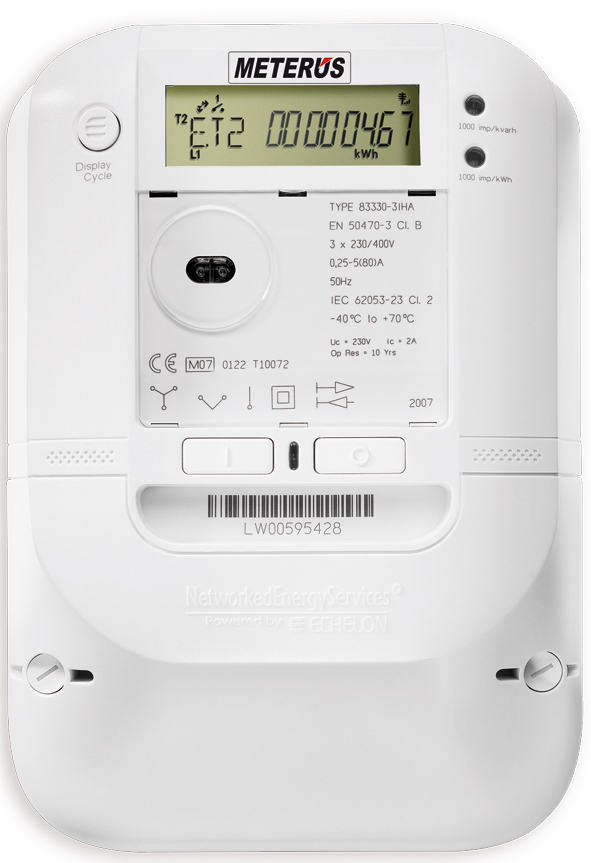
Example of a smart meter based on Open Smart Grid Protocol (OSGP) in use in Europe that has the ability to reduce load, disconnect-reconnect remotely, and interface to gas and water meters

A smart meter is an electronic device that records information—such as consumption of electric energy, voltage levels, current, and power factor—and communicates the information to the consumer and electricity suppliers. Advanced metering infrastructure (AMI) differs from automatic meter reading (AMR) in that it enables two-way communication between the meter and the supplier.

== Description ==
The term smart meter often refers to an electricity meter, but it also may mean a device measuring natural gas, water or district heating consumption. More generally, a smart meter is an electronic device that records information such as consumption of electric energy, voltage levels, current, and power factor. Smart meters communicate the information to the consumer for greater clarity of consumption behavior, and electricity suppliers for system monitoring and customer billing. Smart meters typically record energy near real-time, and report regularly, in short intervals throughout the day. Smart meters enable two-way communication between the meter and the central system. Smart meters may be part of a smart grid, but do not themselves constitute a smart grid.

Advanced Metering Infrastructure (AMI) differs from Automated Meter Reading (AMR) in that it enables two-way communication between the meter and the supplier. Communications from the meter to the network may be wireless, or via fixed wired connections such as power-line communication (PLC). Wireless communication options in common use include cellular communications, Wi-Fi (readily available), wireless ad hoc networks over Wi-Fi, wireless mesh networks, low power long-range wireless (LoRa), Wize (high radio penetration rate, open, using the frequency 169 MHz) Zigbee (low power, low data rate wireless), and Wi-SUN (Smart Utility Networks).

Similar meters, usually referred to as interval or time-of-use meters, have existed for years, but smart meters usually involve real-time or near real-time sensors, power outage notification, and power quality monitoring. These additional features are more than simple AMR. They are similar in many respects to AMI meters. Interval and time-of-use meters historically have been installed to measure commercial and industrial customers, but may not have automatic reading. Research by the UK consumer group, showed that as many as one in three confuse smart meters with energy monitors, also known as in-home display monitors.

== History ==
In 1972, Theodore Paraskevakos, while working with Boeing in Huntsville, Alabama, developed a sensor monitoring system that used digital transmission for security, fire, and medical alarm systems as well as meter reading capabilities. This technology was a spin-off from the automatic telephone line identification system, now known as Caller ID.

In 1974, Paraskevakos was awarded a U.S. patent for this technology. In 1977, he launched Metretek, Inc., which developed and produced the first smart meters. Since this system was developed pre-Internet, Metretek utilized the IBM series 1 mini-computer. For this approach, Paraskevakos and Metretek were awarded multiple patents.

The installed base of smart meters in Europe at the end of 2008 was about 39 million units, according to analyst firm Berg Insight. Globally, Pike Research found that smart meter shipments were 17.4 million units for the first quarter of 2011. Visiongain determined that the value of the global smart meter market would reach US$7 billion in 2012.

H.M. Zahid Iqbal, M. Waseem, and Dr. Tahir Mahmood, researchers of University of Engineering & Technology Taxila, Pakistan, introduced the concept of Smart Energy Meters in 2013. Their article, "Automatic Energy Meter Reading using Smart Energy Meter" outlined the key features of Smart Energy Meter including Automatic remote meter reading via GSM for utility companies and customers, Real-time monitoring of a customer's running load, Remote disconnection and reconnection of customer connections by the utility company and Convenient billing, eliminating the need of meter readers to physically visit the customers for billing.

As of January 2018, over 99 million electricity meters were deployed across the European Union, with an estimated 24 million more to be installed by the end of 2020. The European Commission DG Energy estimates the 2020 installed base to have required €18.8 billion in investment, growing to €40.7 billion by 2030, with a total deployment of 266 million smart meters.

By the end of 2018, the U.S. had over 86 million smart meters installed. In 2017, there were 665 million smart meters installed globally. Revenue generation is expected to grow from $12.8 billion in 2017 to $20 billion by 2022.

== Purpose ==
Since the inception of electricity deregulation and market-driven pricing throughout the world, utilities have been looking for a means to match consumption with generation. Non-smart electrical and gas meters only measure total consumption, providing no information of when the energy was consumed. Smart meters provide a way of measuring electricity consumption in near real-time. This allows utility companies to charge different prices for consumption according to the time of day and the season. It also facilitates more accurate cash-flow models for utilities. Since smart meters can be read remotely, labor costs are reduced for utilities.

Smart metering offers potential benefits to customers. These include, a) an end to estimated bills, which are a major source of complaints for many customers b) a tool to help consumers better manage their energy purchases—smart meters with a home display (or smartphone app) provides up-to-date information on gas and electricity consumption and in doing so help people to manage their energy use and reduce their energy bills. With regards to consumption reduction, this is critical for understanding the benefits of smart meters because the relatively small percentage benefits in terms of savings are multiplied by millions of users. Smart meters for water consumption can also provide detailed and timely information about customer water use and early notification of possible water leaks in their premises. Electricity consumption, and hence pricing, usually peaks at certain predictable times of the day and the season. In particular, if generation is constrained, prices can rise when power from other jurisdictions or more costly generation is brought online. Proponents assert that billing customers at a higher rate for peak times encourages consumers to adjust their consumption habits to be more responsive to market prices and assert further, that regulatory and market design agencies hope these "price signals" could delay the construction of additional generation or at least the purchase of energy from higher-priced sources, thereby controlling the steady and rapid increase of electricity prices.

A 2013 academic study based on existing trials showed that homeowners' electricity consumption on average is reduced by approximately 3-5% when provided with real-time feedback.

Another advantage of smart meters that benefits both customers and the utility is the monitoring capability they provide for the whole electrical system. As part of an AMI, utilities can use the real-time data from smart meters measurements related to current, voltage, and power factor to detect system disruptions more quickly, allowing immediate corrective action to minimize customer impact such as blackouts. Smart meters also help utilities understand the power grid needs with more granularity than legacy meters. This greater understanding facilitates system planning to meet customer energy needs while reducing the likelihood of additional infrastructure investments, which eliminates unnecessary spending or energy cost increases.

Though the task of meeting national electricity demand with accurate supply is becoming ever more challenging as intermittent renewable generation sources make up a greater proportion of the energy mix, the real-time data provided by smart meters allow grid operators to integrate renewable energy onto the grid in order to balance the networks. As a result, smart meters are considered an essential technology to the decarbonisation of the energy system.

== Advanced metering infrastructure ==
Advanced metering infrastructure (AMI) refers to systems that measure, collect, and analyze energy usage, and communicate with metering devices such as electricity meters, gas meters, heat meters, and water meters, either on request or on a schedule. These systems include hardware, software, communications, consumer energy displays and controllers, customer associated systems, meter data management software, and supplier business systems.

Government agencies and utilities are turning toward advanced metering infrastructure (AMI) systems as part of larger "smart grid" initiatives. AMI extends automatic meter reading (AMR) technology by providing two-way meter communications, allowing commands to be sent toward the home for multiple purposes, including time-based pricing information, demand-response actions, or remote service disconnects. Wireless technologies are critical elements of the neighborhood network, aggregating a mesh configuration of up to thousands of meters for back haul to the utility's IT headquarters.

The network between the measurement devices and business systems allows the collection and distribution of information to customers, suppliers, utility companies, and service providers. This enables these businesses to participate in demand response services. Consumers can use the information provided by the system to change their normal consumption patterns to take advantage of lower prices. Pricing can be used to curb the growth of peak demand consumption. AMI differs from traditional automatic meter reading (AMR) in that it enables two-way communications with the meter. Systems only capable of meter readings do not qualify as AMI systems.

AMI implementation relies on four key components: Physical Layer Connectivity, which establishes connections between smart meters and networks, Communication Protocols to ensure secure and efficient data transmission, Server Infrastructure, which consists of centralized or distributed servers to store, process, and manage data for billing, monitoring, and demand response; and Data Analysis, where analytical tools provide insights, load forecasting, and anomaly detection for optimized energy management. Together, these components help utilities and consumers monitor and manage energy use efficiently, supporting smarter grid management.

=== Physical Layer Connectivity ===
Communication is a cornerstone of smart meter technology, enabling reliable and secure data transmission to central systems. However, the diversity of environments in which smart meters operate presents significant challenges. Solutions to these challenges encompass a range of communication methods including Power-line communication (PLC), Cellular network, Wireless mesh network, Short-range:

- Power-line communication for Smart Metering

Power Line Communication (PLC) (Note: This should not be confused with home PLC systems, which are used for in-building communication and networking.) stands out among smart metering connectivity technologies because it leverages existing electrical power infrastructure for data transmission. Unlike cellular, radio-frequency (RF), or Wi-Fi-based solutions, PLC does not require building or maintaining separate communication networks, making it inherently more cost-effective and easier to scale. Two major PLC standards in smart metering are G3-PLC and the PRIME Alliance protocol. G3-PLC supports IPv6-based communications and adaptive data rates, providing robust performance even in noisy environments, while PRIME (PoweRline Intelligent Metering Evolution) focuses on efficient, high-speed communication with low-cost implementation. PLC-based smart metering is deployed extensively in regions like Europe, South America, and parts of Asia where dense infrastructure supports its use.

Utilities favor PLC for its reliability in urban environments and for connecting large numbers of meters within smart grid networks.

An important feature of G3-PLC and PRIME is their ability to enable mesh networking (also called multi-hop), where smart meters act as repeaters for other meters in the network. This functionality allows meters to relay data from neighboring meters to ensure that the information reaches the Data Concentrator Unit (DCU), even if direct communication is not possible due to distance or signal obstructions. This approach enhances network reliability and coverage, particularly in dense urban environments or geographically challenging areas.

- Cellular Network (GPRS, NB-IoT, LTE-M): "Cellular technologies are highly scalable and secure. With national coverage, cellular connectivity can support a large number of meters in densely populated areas as well as reach those in remote locations."
- Wireless mesh network (e.g. Wirepas and Wi-Sun): Ideal for urban areas, where devices can relay data to optimize coverage and reliability. It is mostly used for Water Meter and Gas Meter
- Short-range: such as Wireless M-Bus (WMBUS) are commonly used in smart metering applications to enable reliable, low-power communication between utility meters and local data collectors within buildings or neighborhoods.
- Hybrid PLC/RF PRIME and G3-PLC standards defines an integrated approach for seamless integration of PLC and wireless communication, enhancing reliability and flexibility in smart grids.

The challenges faced by rural utilities differ significantly from those of urban counterparts or utilities in remote, mountainous, or poorly serviced areas.

Smart meters often extend their functionality through integration into Home Area Networks (HANs). These networks enable communication within the household and may include:

- In-Premises Displays: Providing real-time energy usage insights for consumers.
- Hubs: Interfacing multiple meters with the central head-end system.

Technologies used in HANs vary globally but typically include PLC, wireless ad hoc networks, and Zigbee. By leveraging appropriate connectivity solutions, smart meters can address environmental and infrastructural needs while delivering communication and enhanced functionality.

=== Communication interface architecture ===
The communication interface may be either:

- Integrated within the meter: a smart meter includes its own communication module (e.g.: cellular, RF-Mesh, PLC) and transmits data directly (or through a data concentrator) to utility servers. These meters can also form a local mesh network and act as relays for nearby devices without direct WAN access.
- Handled by an external local gateway next to the meter: in this architecture, the meter is limited to basic metrology and uses a local interface (e.g.: RS-485, Ethernet, or Wireless M-Bus) to forward data to a nearby gateway device. This gateway, often referred to as a smart meter gateway (SMGW) performs protocol translation, encryption, and handles upstream communication to utility systems via WAN technologies such as LTE, Ethernet or Wi-Fi.

==== Smart meters used as a gateway for water and gas meters ====
Electricity smart meters start to be utilized as gateways for gas and water meters, creating integrated smart metering systems. In this configuration, gas and water meters communicate with the electricity meter using Wireless M-Bus (Wireless Meter-Bus), a European standard (EN 13757-4) designed for secure and efficient data transmission between utility meters and data collectors. The electricity meter then aggregates this data and transmits it to the central utility network via Power Line Communication (PLC), which leverages existing electrical wiring for data transfer.

=== Communication Protocols ===
Smart meter communication protocols are essential for enabling reliable, efficient, and secure data exchange between meters, utilities, and other components of advanced metering infrastructure (AMI). These protocols address the diverse requirements of global markets, supporting various communication methods, from optical ports and serial connections to power line communication (PLC) and wireless networks. Below is an overview of key protocols, including ANSI standards widely used in North America, IEC protocols prevalent in Europe, the globally recognized OSGP for smart grid applications, and the PLC-focused Meters and More, each designed to meet specific needs in energy monitoring and management.

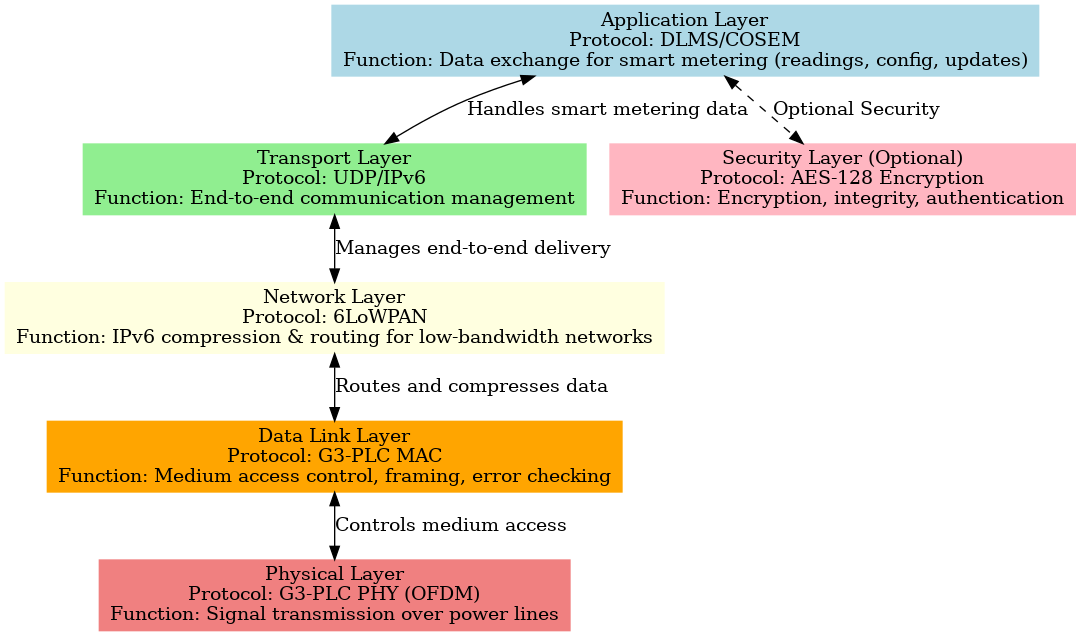
Typical communication stacks from Smart Meter to DC

- IEC 62056

"IEC 62056 is the most widely adopted protocol" for smart meter communication, enabling reliable, two-way data exchange within Advanced Metering Infrastructure (AMI) systems. It encompasses the DLMS/COSEM protocol for structuring and managing metering data. "It is widely used because of its flexibility, scalability, and ability to support different communication media such as Power Line Communication (PLC), TCP/IP, and wireless networks.". It also supports data transmission over serial connections using ASCII or binary formats, with physical media options such as modulated light (via LED and photodiode) or wired connections (typically EIA-485).

- ANSI C12.18

ANSI C12.18 is an ANSI Standard that describes a protocol used for two-way communications with a meter, mostly used in North American markets. The C12.18 Standard is written specifically for meter communications via an ANSI Type 2 Optical Port, and specifies lower-level protocol details. ANSI C12.19 specifies the data tables that are used. ANSI C12.21 is an extension of C12.18 written for modem instead of optical communications, so it is better suited to automatic meter reading. ANSI C12.22 is the communication protocol for remote communications.

- OSGP

The Open Smart Grid Protocol (OSGP) is a family of specifications published by the European Telecommunications Standards Institute (ETSI) used in conjunction with the ISO/IEC 14908 control networking standard for smart metering and smart grid applications. Millions of smart meters based on OSGP are deployed worldwide. On July 15, 2015, the OSGP Alliance announced the release of a new security protocol (OSGP-AES-128-PSK) and its availability from OSGP vendors. This deprecated the original OSGP-RC4-PSK security protocol which had been identified to be vulnerable.

- Meters and More

"Meters and More was created in 2010 from the coordinated work between Enel and Endesa to adopt, maintain and evolve the field-proven Meters and More open communication protocol for smart grid solutions." . In 2010, the Meters and More Association was established to promote the protocol globally, ensuring interoperability and efficiency in power line communication (PLC)-based smart metering systems. Meters and More is an open communication protocol designed for advanced metering infrastructure (AMI). It facilitates reliable, high-speed data exchange over PLC networks, focusing on energy monitoring, demand response, and secure two-way communication between utilities and consumers. Unlike DLMS/COSEM, which is a globally standardized and versatile protocol supporting multiple utilities (electricity, gas, and water), Meters and More is tailored specifically for PLC-based systems, emphasizing efficiency, reliability, and ease of deployment in electricity metering.

There is a growing trend toward the use of TCP/IP technology as a common communication platform for Smart Meter applications, so that utilities can deploy multiple communication systems, while using IP technology as a common management platform. A universal metering interface would allow for development and mass production of smart meters and smart grid devices prior to the communication standards being set, and then for the relevant communication modules to be easily added or switched when they are. This would lower the risk of investing in the wrong standard as well as permit a single product to be used globally even if regional communication standards vary.

=== Server Infrastructure for Smart Meter AMI ===
In Advanced Metering Infrastructure (AMI), the server infrastructure is crucial for managing, storing, and processing the large volumes of data generated by smart meters. This infrastructure ensures seamless communication between smart meters, utility providers, and end-users, supporting real-time monitoring, billing, and grid management.

Key Components of AMI Server Infrastructure

Data Concentrator

A Data Concentrator Unit (DCU) aggregates data from multiple smart meters within a localized area (e.g., a neighborhood or building) before transmitting it to the central server. Data concentrators reduce the communication load on the network and help overcome connectivity challenges by acting as intermediaries between smart meters and the head-end system (HES). They typically support communication protocols like IEC 62056, DLMS/COSEM

Head-End System (HES)

The HES is responsible for collecting, validating, and managing data received from data concentrators and smart meters. It serves as the central communication hub, facilitating two-way communication between the smart meters and the utility's central servers. The HES supports meter configuration, firmware updates, and real-time data retrieval, ensuring data integrity and security.

Meter Data Management System (MDMS)

The MDMS is a specialized software platform that stores and processes large volumes of meter data collected by the HES. Key functions of the MDMS include data validation, estimation, and editing, as well as billing preparation, load analysis, and anomaly detection. The MDMS integrates with other utility systems, such as billing, customer relationship management (CRM), and demand response systems, to enable efficient energy management.

=== Data Analytics ===
Data analytics for smart meters leverages machine learning to extract insights from energy consumption data. Key applications include demand forecasting, dynamic pricing, Energy Disaggregation, and fault detection, enabling optimized grid performance and personalized energy management. These techniques drive efficiency, cost savings, and sustainability in modern energy systems.

"Energy Disaggregation, or the breakdown of your energy use based on specific appliances or devices", is an exploratory technique for analyzing energy consumption in households, commercial buildings, and industrial settings. By using data from a single energy meter, it employs algorithms and machine learning to estimate individual appliance usage without separate monitors. Known as Non-Intrusive Load Monitoring (NILM), this emerging method offers insights into energy efficiency, helping users optimize usage and reduce costs. While promising, energy disaggregation is still being refined for accuracy and scalability as part of smart energy management innovations.

=== Data management ===
The other critical technology for smart meter systems is the information technology at the utility that integrates the Smart Meter networks with utility applications, such as billing and CIS. This includes the Meter Data Management system.

It also is essential for smart grid implementations that power line communication (PLC) technologies used within the home over a Home Area Network (HAN), are standardized and compatible. The HAN allows HVAC systems and other household appliances to communicate with the smart meter, and from there to the utility. Currently there are several broadband or narrowband standards in place, or being developed, that are not yet compatible. To address this issue in the United States, the National Institute for Standards and Technology (NIST) established the PAP15 group, which studies and recommends coexistence mechanisms with a focus on the harmonization of PLC Standards for the HAN. The objective of the group is to ensure that all PLC technologies selected for the HAN coexist as a minimum. The two leading broadband PLC technologies selected are the HomePlug AV / IEEE 1901 and ITU-T G.hn technologies. Technical working groups within these organizations are working to develop appropriate coexistence mechanisms. The HomePlug Powerline Alliance has developed a new standard for smart grid HAN communications called the HomePlug Green PHY specification. It is interoperable and coexistent with the widely deployed HomePlug AV technology and with the latest IEEE 1901 global Standard and is based on Broadband OFDM technology. ITU-T commissioned in 2010 a new project called G.hnem, to address the home networking aspects of energy management, built upon existing Low Frequency Narrowband OFDM technologies.

== Opposition and concerns ==
Some groups have expressed concerns regarding the cost, health, fire risk, security and privacy effects of smart meters and the remote controllable "kill switch" that is included with most of them. Many of these concerns regard wireless-only smart meters with no home energy monitoring or control or safety features. Metering-only solutions, while popular with utilities because they fit existing business models and have cheap up-front capital costs, often result in such "backlash". Often the entire smart grid and smart building concept is discredited in part by confusion about the difference between home control and home area network technology and AMI. The (now former) attorney general of Connecticut has stated that he does not believe smart meters provide any financial benefit to consumers, however, the cost of the installation of the new system is absorbed by those customers.

=== Security ===
Smart meters expose the power grid to cyberattacks that could lead to power outages, both by cutting off people's electricity and by overloading the grid. However many cybersecurity experts state that smart meters of the UK and Germany have relatively high cybersecurity and that any such attack there would thus require extraordinarily high efforts or financial resources. The EU Cybersecurity Act took effect in June 2019, which includes Directive on Security Network and Information Systems establishing notification and security requirements for operators of essential services.

Through the Smartgrid Cybersecurity Committee, the U.S. Department of Energy published cybersecurity guidelines for grid operators in 2010 and updated them in 2014. The guidelines "...present an analytical framework that organizations can use to develop effective cybersecurity strategies..."

Implementing security protocols that protect these devices from malicious attacks has been problematic, due to their limited computational resources and long operational life.

The current version of IEC 62056 includes the possibility to encrypt, authenticate, or sign the meter data.

One proposed smart meter data verification method involves analyzing the network traffic in real-time to detect anomalies using an Intrusion Detection System (IDS). By identifying exploits as they are being leveraged by attackers, an IDS mitigates the suppliers' risks of energy theft by consumers and denial-of-service attacks by hackers. Energy utilities must choose between a centralized IDS, embedded IDS, or dedicated IDS depending on the individual needs of the utility. Researchers have found that for a typical advanced metering infrastructure, the centralized IDS architecture is superior in terms of cost efficiency and security gains.

In the United Kingdom, the Data Communication Company, which transports the commands from the supplier to the smart meter, performs an additional anomaly check on commands issued (and signed) by the energy supplier.

As Smart Meter devices are Intelligent Measurement Devices which periodically record the measured values and send the data encrypted to the Service Provider, therefore in Switzerland these devices need to be evaluated by an evaluation Laboratory, and need to be certified by METAS from 01.01.2020 according to Prüfmethodologie (Test Methodology for Execution of Data Security Evaluation of Swiss Smart Metering Components).

According to a report published by Brian Krebs, in 2009 a Puerto Rico electricity supplier asked the FBI to investigate large-scale thefts of electricity related to its smart meters. The FBI found that former employees of the power company and the company that made the meters were being paid by consumers to reprogram the devices to show incorrect results, as well as teaching people how to do it themselves. Several hacking tools that allow security researchers and penetration testers verify the security of electric utility smart meters have been released so far.

=== Health ===
Most health concerns about the meters arise from the pulsed radiofrequency (RF) radiation emitted by wireless smart meters.

Members of the California State Assembly asked the California Council on Science and Technology (CCST) to study the issue of potential health impacts from smart meters, in particular whether current FCC standards are protective of public health. The CCST report in April 2011 found no health impacts, based both on lack of scientific evidence of harmful effects from radio frequency (RF) waves and that the RF exposure of people in their homes to smart meters is likely to be minuscule compared to RF exposure to cell phones and microwave ovens.

Daniel Hirsch, retired director of the Program on Environmental and Nuclear Policy at UC Santa Cruz, criticized the CCST report on the grounds that it did not consider studies that suggest the potential for non-thermal health effects such as latent cancers from RF exposure. Hirsch also stated that the CCST report failed to correct errors in its comparison to cell phones and microwave ovens and that, when these errors are corrected, smart meters "may produce cumulative whole-body exposures far higher than that of cell phones or microwave ovens."

The Federal Communications Commission (FCC) has adopted recommended Permissible Exposure Limit (PEL) for all RF transmitters (including smart meters) operating at frequencies of 300 kHz to 100 GHz. These limits, based on field strength and power density, are below the levels of RF radiation that are hazardous to human health.

Other studies substantiate the finding of the California Council on Science and Technology (CCST). In 2011, the Electric Power Research Institute performed a study to gauge human exposure to smart meters as compared to the FCC PEL. The report found that most smart meters only transmit RF signals 1% of the time or less. At this rate, and at a distance of 1 foot from the meter, RF exposure would be at a rate of 0.14% of the FCC PEL.

An indirect potential for harm to health by smart meters is that they enable energy companies to disconnect consumers remotely, typically in response to difficulties with payment. This can cause health problems to vulnerable people in financial difficulty; in addition to denial of heat, lighting, and use of appliances, there are people who depend on power to use medical equipment essential for life. While there may be legal protections in place to protect the vulnerable, many people in the UK were disconnected in violation of the rules.

=== Safety ===
Issues surrounding smart meters causing fires have been reported, particularly involving the manufacturer Sensus. In 2012. PECO Energy Company replaced the Sensus meters it had deployed in the Philadelphia, US region after reports that a number of the units had overheated and caused fires. In July 2014, SaskPower, the province-run utility company of the Canadian province of Saskatchewan, halted its roll-out of Sensus meters after similar, isolated incidents were discovered. Shortly afterward, Portland General Electric announced that it would replace 70,000 smart meters that had been deployed in the state of Oregon after similar reports. The company noted that it had been aware of the issues since at least 2013, and they were limited to specific models it had installed between 2010 and 2012. On July 30, 2014, after a total of eight recent fire incidents involving the meters, SaskPower was ordered by the Government of Saskatchewan to immediately end its smart meter program, and remove the 105,000 smart meters it had installed.

=== Privacy concerns ===
One technical reason for privacy concerns is that these meters send detailed information about how much electricity is being used each time. More frequent reports provide more detailed information. Infrequent reports may be of little benefit for the provider, as it doesn't allow as good demand management in the response of changing needs for electricity. On the other hand, widespread reports would allow the utility company to infer behavioral patterns for the occupants of a house, such as when the members of the household are probably asleep or absent. Furthermore, the fine-grained information collected by smart meters raises growing concerns of privacy invasion due to personal behavior exposure (private activity, daily routine, etc.). Current trends are to increase the frequency of reports. A solution that benefits both provider and user privacy would be to adapt the interval dynamically. Another solution involves energy storage installed at the household used to reshape the energy consumption profile. In British Columbia the electric utility is government-owned and as such must comply with privacy laws that prevent the sale of data collected by smart meters; many parts of the world are serviced by private companies that are able to sell their data. In Australia debt collectors can make use of the data to know when people are at home. Used as evidence in a court case in Austin, Texas, police agencies secretly collected smart meter power usage data from thousands of residences to determine which used more power than "typical" to identify marijuana growing operations.

Smart meter power data usage patterns can reveal much more than how much power is being used. Research has demonstrated that smart meters sampling power levels at two-second intervals can reliably identify when different electrical devices are in use.

Ross Anderson wrote about privacy concerns "It is not necessary for my meter to tell the power company, let alone the government, how much I used in every half-hour period last month"; that meters can provide "targeting information for burglars"; that detailed energy usage history can help energy companies to sell users exploitative contracts; and that there may be "a temptation for policymakers to use smart metering data to target any needed power cuts."

=== Opt-out options ===
Reviews of smart meter programs, moratoriums, delays, and "opt-out" programs are some responses to the concerns of customers and government officials. In response to residents who did not want a smart meter, in June 2012 a utility in Hawaii changed its smart meter program to "opt out". The utility said that once the smart grid installation project is nearing completion, KIUC may convert the deferral policy to an opt-out policy or program and may charge a fee to those members to cover the costs of servicing the traditional meters. Any fee would require approval from the Hawaii Public Utilities Commission.

After receiving numerous complaints about health, hacking, and privacy concerns with the wireless digital devices, the Public Utility Commission of the US state of Maine voted to allow customers to opt-out of the meter change at the cost of $12 a month. In Connecticut, another US state to consider smart metering, regulators declined a request by the state's largest utility, Connecticut Light & Power, to install 1.2 million of the devices, arguing that the potential savings in electric bills do not justify the cost. CL&P already offers its customers time-based rates. The state's Attorney General George Jepsen was quoted as saying the proposal would cause customers to spend upwards of $500 million on meters and get few benefits in return, a claim that Connecticut Light & Power disputed.

=== Abuse of dynamic pricing ===
Smart meters allow dynamic pricing; it has been pointed out that, while this allows prices to be reduced at times of low demand, it can also be used to increase prices at peak times if all consumers have smart meters. Additionally smart meters allow energy suppliers to switch customers to expensive prepay tariffs instantly in case of difficulties paying. In the UK during a period of very high energy prices from 2021, companies were remotely switching smart meters from a credit tariff to an expensive prepay tariff which disconnects supplies unless credit has been purchased. While regulations do not permit this without appropriate precautions to help those in financial difficulties and to protect the vulnerable, the rules were often flouted. (Prepaid tariffs could also be levied without smart meters, but this required a dedicated prepay meter to be installed.) In 2022, 3.2 million people were left without power at some point after running out of prepay credit, and 30 energy companies went bankcrupt as customer payments were insufficient to cover the increased energy cost.

=== Limited benefits ===
There are questions about whether electricity is or should be primarily a "when you need it" service where the inconvenience/cost-benefit ratio of time-shifting of loads is poor. In the Chicago area, Commonwealth Edison ran a test installing smart meters on 8,000 randomly selected households together with variable rates and rebates to encourage cutting back during peak usage. In Crain's Chicago Business article "Smart grid test underwhelms. In the pilot, few power down to save money.", it was reported that fewer than 9% exhibited any amount of peak usage reduction and that the overall amount of reduction was "statistically insignificant". This was from a report by the Electric Power Research Institute, a utility industry think tank who conducted the study and prepared the report. Susan Satter, senior assistant Illinois attorney general for public utilities said "It's devastating to their plan...The report shows zero statistically different result compared to business as usual."

By 2016, the 7 million smart meters in Texas had not persuaded many people to check their energy data as the process was too complicated.

A report from a parliamentary group in the UK suggests people who have smart meters installed are expected to save an average of £11 annually on their energy bills, much less than originally hoped. The 2016 cost-benefit analysis was updated in 2019 and estimated a similar average saving.

The Australian Victorian Auditor-General found in 2015 that 'Victoria's electricity consumers will have paid an estimated $2.239 billion for metering services, including the rollout and connection of smart meters. In contrast, while a few benefits have accrued to consumers, benefits realisation is behind schedule and most benefits are yet to be realised'

=== Erratic demand ===
Smart meters can allow real-time pricing, and in theory this could help smooth power consumption as consumers adjust their demand in response to price changes. However, modelling by researchers at the University of Bremen suggests that in certain circumstances, "power demand fluctuations are not dampened but amplified instead."

=== In the media ===
In 2013, Take Back Your Power, an independent Canadian documentary directed by Josh del Sol was released describing "dirty electricity" and the aforementioned issues with smart meters. The film explores the various contexts of the health, legal, and economic concerns. It features narration from the mayor of Peterborough, Ontario, Daryl Bennett, as well as American researcher De-Kun Li, journalist Blake Levitt, and Dr. Sam Milham. It won a Leo Award for best feature-length documentary and the Annual Humanitarian Award from Indie Fest the following year.

=== UK roll-out criticism ===
In a 2011 submission to the Public Accounts Committee, Ross Anderson wrote that Ofgem was "making all the classic mistakes which have been known for years to lead to public-sector IT project failures" and that the "most critical part of the project—how smart meters will talk to domestic appliances to facilitate demand response—is essentially ignored."

Citizens Advice said in August 2018 that 80% of people with smart meters were happy with them. Still, it had 3,000 calls in 2017 about problems. These related to first-generation smart meters losing their functionality, aggressive sales practices, and still having to send smart meter readings.

Ross Anderson of the Foundation for Information Policy Research has criticised the UK's program on the grounds that it is unlikely to lower energy consumption, is rushed and expensive, and does not promote metering competition. Anderson writes, "the proposed architecture ensures continued dominance of metering by energy industry incumbents whose financial interests are in selling more energy rather than less," and urged ministers "to kill the project and instead promote competition in domestic energy metering, as the Germans do – and as the UK already has in industrial metering. Every consumer should have the right to appoint the meter operator of their choice."

The high number of SMETS1 meters installed has been criticized by Peter Earl, head of energy at the price comparison website comparethemarket.com. He said, "The Government expected there would only be a small number of the first-generation of smart meters before Smets II came in, but the reality is there are now at least five million and perhaps as many as 10 million Smets I meters."

UK smart meters in southern England and the Midlands use the mobile phone network to communicate, so they do not work correctly when phone coverage is weak. A solution has been proposed, but was not operational as of March 2017.

In March 2018 the National Audit Office (NAO), which watches over public spending, opened an investigation into the smart meter program, which had cost £11bn by then, paid for by electricity users through higher bills. The National Audit Office published the findings of its investigation in a report titled "Rolling out smart meters" published in November 2018. The report, amongst other findings, indicated that the number of smart meters installed in the UK would fall materially short of the Department for Business, Energy & Industrial Strategy (BEIS) original ambitions of all UK consumers having a smart meter installed by 2020. In September 2019, smart meter rollout in the UK was delayed for four years.

Ross Anderson and Alex Henney wrote that "Ed Miliband cooked the books" to make a case for smart meters appear economically viable. They say that the first three cost-benefit analyses of residential smart meters found that it would cost more than it would save, but "ministers kept on trying until they got a positive result... To achieve 'profitability' the previous government stretched the assumptions shamelessly".

A counter-fraud officer at Ofgem with oversight of the roll-out of the smart meter program who raised concerns with his manager about many millions of pounds being misspent was threatened in 2018 with imprisonment under section 105 of the Utilities Act 2000, prohibiting disclosure of some information relevant to the energy sector, with the intention of protecting national security. The Employment Appeal Tribunal found that the law was in contravention of the European Convention on Human Rights.

== Main suppliers ==
Top ten smart electricity meters suppliers depends on the ranking method

Among them

- Landis+Gyr
- Itron
- Xylem (formerly Sensus)
- Sagemcom
- Honeywell / Elster
- Iskra
- Kamstrup A/S
- Wasion Holdings Limited
- Holley Technology Ltd

== Gallery ==
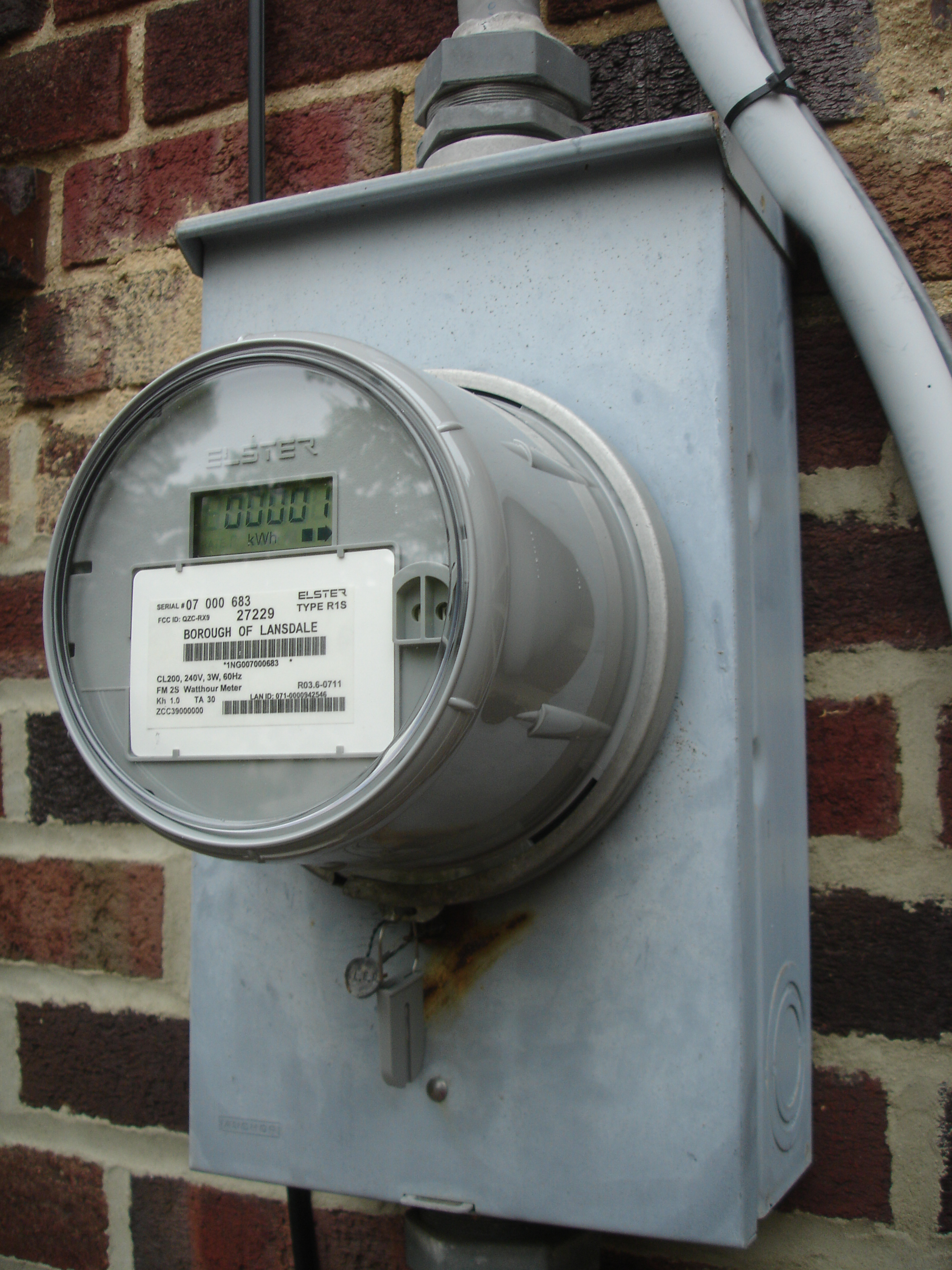
Newer retrofitted U.S. domestic digital electricity meter Elster REX with 900 MHz mesh network topology for automatic meter reading and "EnergyAxis" time-of-use metering

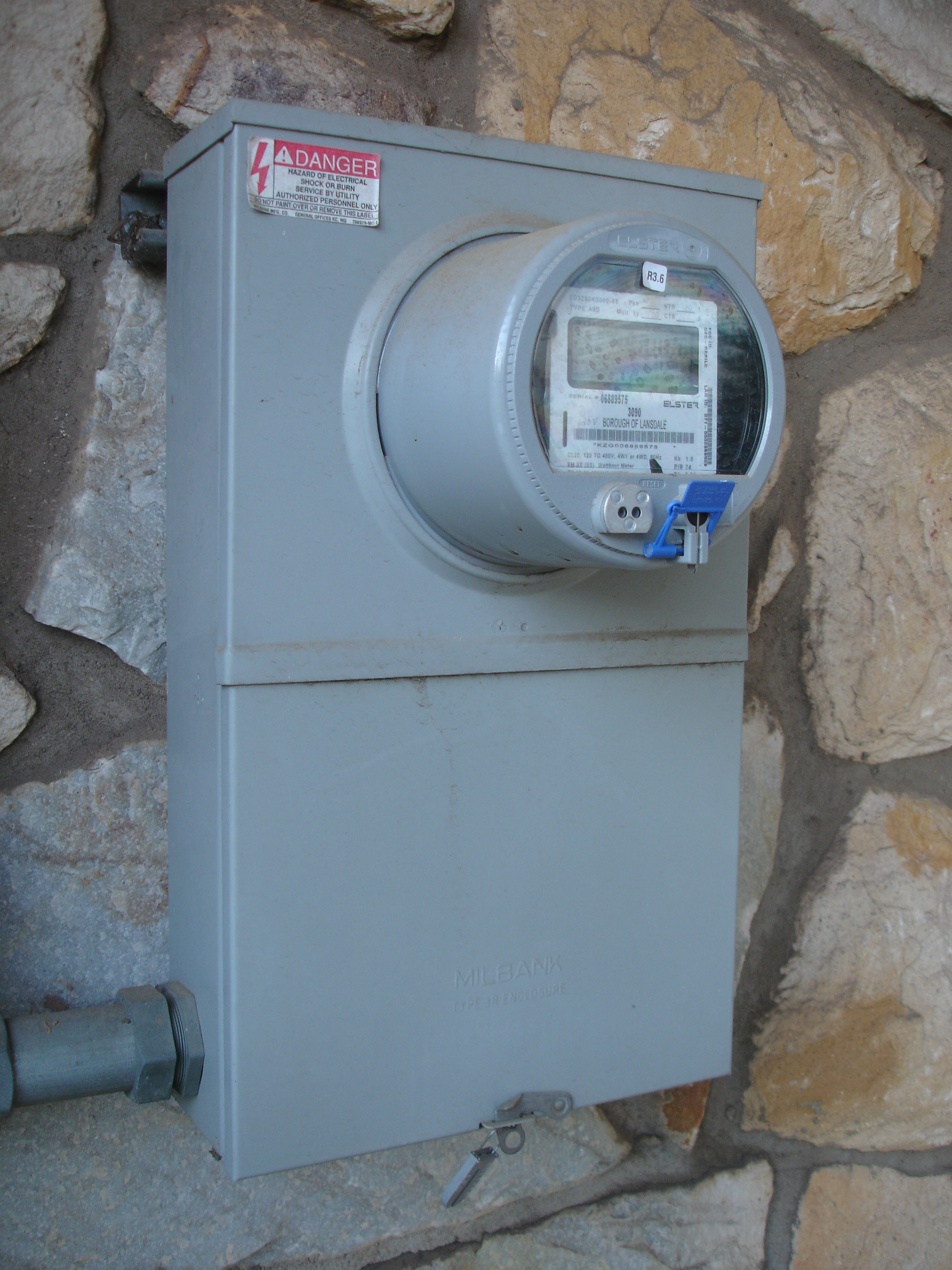
Each local mesh networked smart meter has a hub such as this Elster A3 Type A30, which interfaces 900MHz smart meters to the metering automation server via a landline.

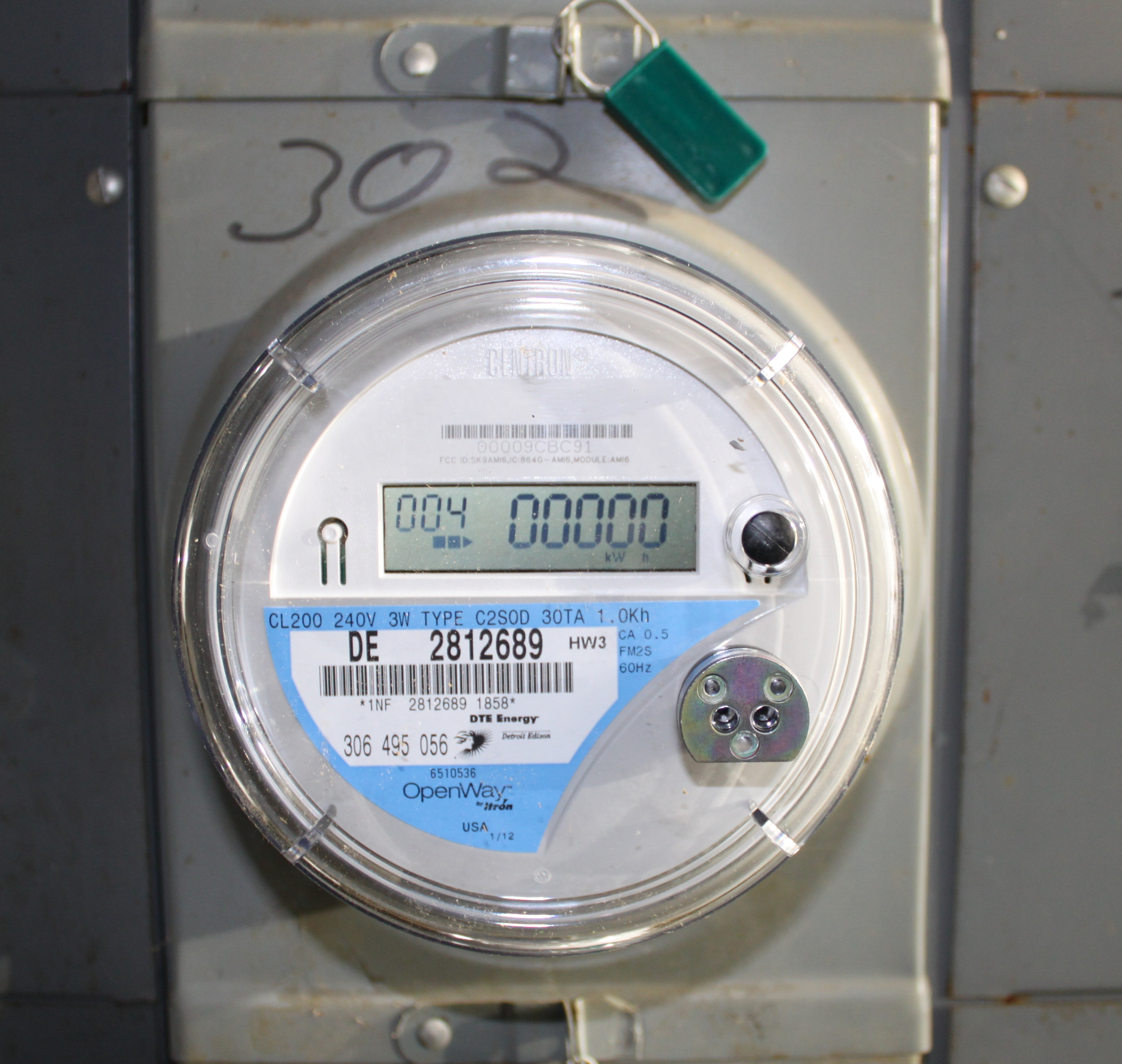
Itron OpenWay electricity Smart meter with two-way communications for remote reading in use by DTE Energy

== See also ==
- DASH7
- Distributed generation
- DLMS
- Electranet
- Home energy monitor
- Home idle load
- Home network
- Meter-Bus
- Meter data management
- Net metering
- Nonintrusive load monitoring
- Open metering system
- Open smart grid protocol
- Power line communication
- Smart grid
- Utility submetering
- Virtual power plant
