= Home idle load =

Type of residential energy consumption

Home idle load is the continuous residential electric energy consumption as measured by smart meters. It differs from standby power (loads) in that it includes energy consumption by devices that cycle on and off within the hourly period of standard smart meters (such as fridges, aquarium heaters, wine coolers, etc.). As such, home idle loads can be measured accurately by smart meters. As at 2014, home idle load constituted an average of 32% of household electricity consumption in the U.S.

== Type of devices ==
The primary categories of devices that contribute to Home Idle Load include:

- Electronic devices that consume electricity while not being actively used (including televisions, game consoles, digital picture frames, etc.)
- Home infrastructure devices (including analog thermostats, doorbells, telephones, clocks, GFCI outlets, smoke alarms, continuous hot water recirculation pumps, etc.).
- Any type of device used to maintain a continuous temperature differential (including freezers, icemakers, refrigerators, wine coolers, terrarium heaters, heated floors, instant hot water dispensers, etc.). Although such devices may need to stay on continuously, more recent models have proven to be more efficient and can result in considerably lower home idle loads.

== Reducing home idle load ==
Approaches to reduce home idle loads include:

- Disabling electronic devices with standby power loads either manually (unplugging) or by managing power strips (including smart power socket types)
- Using a timer switch that stops electric consumption from devices when not in use
- Using a smart power strip with a master outlet that manages electricity for multiple devices
- Replacing older (or malfunctioning) devices with more efficient options
