= Home energy monitor =

Electrical measuring device

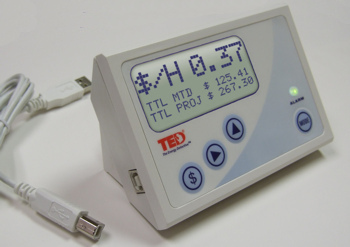
The Energy Detective

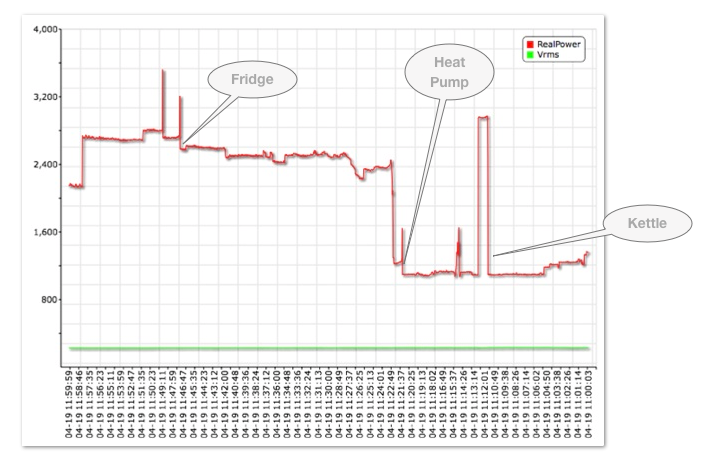
Example of detailed power finger prints

A home energy monitor is a device that provides information about a personal electrical energy usage to a consumer of electricity. Devices may display the amount of electricity used, plus the cost of energy used and estimates of greenhouse gas emissions. The purpose of such devices is to assist in the management of power consumption. Several initiatives have been launched to increase the usage of home energy monitors. Studies have shown a reduction of home energy when the devices are used.

== Description ==
A home energy monitor provides information about electrical energy usage to electricity consumers (e.g., homeowners).. In addition to the amount of electrical usage, devices may display other information, including the cost of energy used and estimates of greenhouse gas emissions. The purpose of such devices is to assist in the management of power consumption.

Home energy monitors consist of a measuring component and a display component. Electricity use is measured with an inductive clamp placed around the electric main, through an optical port on the electric meter, by sensing the meter's actions, communicating with a smart meter, or via a direct connection to the electrical system. Some plug-in units can store their readings when not connected.

The display portion may be remote from the measurement component, communicating with the sensor via cable, network, power line communications, or radio. Online displays are also available, which allow the user to use an internet connected display to show near real-time consumption.

== Initiatives ==
=== Australia ===
In January 2009 the government of the state of Queensland, Australia began offering wireless energy monitors as part of its ClimateSmart Home Service program. In August 2009, nearly 100,000 homes had signed up for the service, and by August 2010, the number had increased to 200,000 homes.

In mid-2013 the government of the state of Victoria, Australia enabled Zigbee-based In-Home Displays to be connected to Victorian Smart Meter. From September 2019, the Victorian households are eligible to avail rebates for home energy monitor installation under the Victorian Energy Upgrades Program.

=== Google PowerMeter ===
Google PowerMeter was a software project of Google's philanthropic arm, Google.org, to help consumers track their home electricity usage that ran from October 5, 2009 to September 16, 2011.

== Studies ==
Various studies have shown a reduction in home energy use of 4-15% through use of home energy display.

A study by Hydro One using the PowerCost Monitor deployed in 500 Ontario homes showed an average 6.5% drop in total electricity use when compared with a similarly sized control group. Based on these results, Hydro One subsequently offered power monitors to 30,000 customers for $8.99 shipping and handling.

A study in the city of Sabadell, Spain in 2009 using the Efergy e2 in 29 households during a six-month period found a drop of 11.8% in weekly consumption between the first and last weeks of the campaign. On a monthly basis, the savings were 14.3%. Expected annual CO_{2} emissions for all households were estimated to reduce by 4.1 tonnes; projected emissions savings for 2020 were 180.6 tonnes.

== See also ==
- AlertMe
- Energy management software
- Google PowerMeter
- Energy conservation
- Hohm
- Home automation
- Kill A Watt
- Nonintrusive load monitoring
- Smart meter
- Wattmeter
