= IEC 62056 =

IEC set of standards for electricity meter data exchange

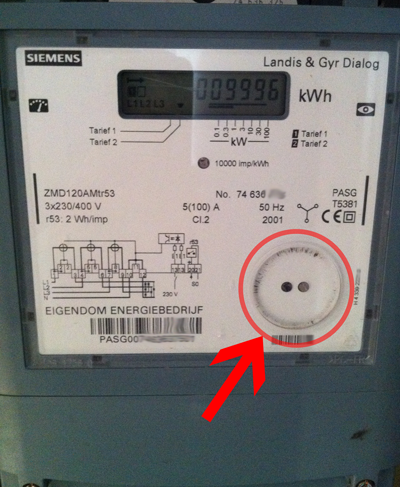
Optical port on a digital kilowatt-hour meter

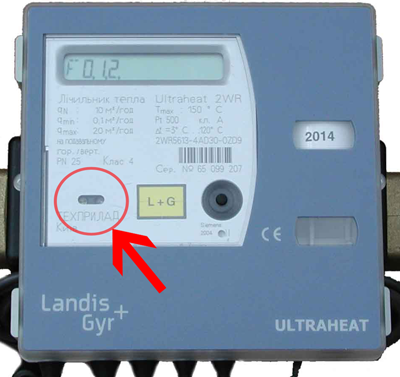
Optical port on a heat meter

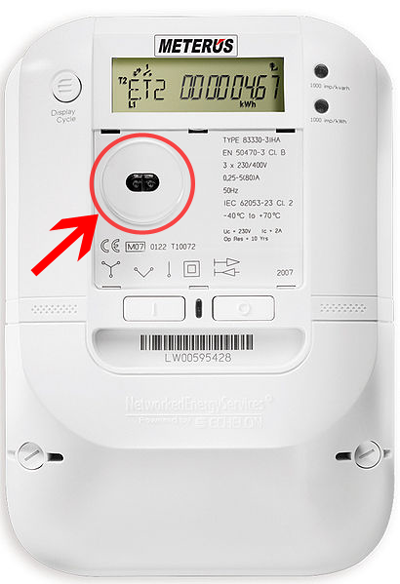
Optical port on a smart kilowatt-hour meter

IEC 62056 is a set of standards for electricity metering data exchange by the International Electrotechnical Commission. The IEC 62056 standards are the international standard versions of the DLMS/COSEM specification.

Device Language Message Specification (DLMS, originally Distribution Line Message Specification), is the suite of standards developed and maintained by the DLMS User Association (DLMS UA) and has been adopted by the IEC TC13 WG14 into the IEC 62056 series of standards. The DLMS User Association maintains a Type D liaison with IEC TC13 WG14, responsible for international standards for meter data exchange and establishing the IEC 62056 series. In this role, the DLMS UA provides maintenance, registration and compliance certification services for IEC 62056 DLMS/COSEM.

Companion Specification for Energy Metering (COSEM) includes a set of specifications that defines the transport and application layers of the DLMS protocol. The DLMS User Association defines the protocols into a set of four specification documents, namely, the Green Book, Yellow Book, Blue Book and White Book. The Blue Book describes the COSEM meter object model and the OBIS object identification system, the Green Book describes the architecture and protocols, the Yellow Book addresses all the questions concerning conformance testing, the White Book contains the glossary of terms. If a product passes the conformance test specified in the Yellow Book, then a certification of DLMS/COSEM compliance is issued by the DLMS UA.

The IEC TC13 WG14 groups the DLMS specifications under the common heading: "Electricity metering data exchange — The DLMS/COSEM suite." DLMS/COSEM protocol is not specific to electricity metering, it is also used for gas, water and heat metering.

== Standards ==
- IEC 62056-1-0:2014 Smart metering standardisation framework
- IEC 62056-3-1:2013 Use of local area networks on twisted pair with carrier signalling
- IEC 62056-4-7:2014 DLMS/COSEM transport layer for IP networks
- IEC 62056-5-3:2017 DLMS/COSEM application layer
- IEC 62056-6-1:2017 Object Identification System (OBIS)
- IEC 62056-6-2:2017 COSEM interface classes
- IEC 62056-6-9:2016 Mapping between the Common Information Model message profiles (IEC 61968-9) and DLMS/COSEM (IEC 62056) data models and protocols
- IEC 62056-7-3:2017 Wired and wireless M-Bus communication profiles for local and neighbourhood networks
- IEC 62056-7-5:2016 Local data transmission profiles for Local Networks (LN)
- IEC 62056-7-6:2013 The three-layer, connection-oriented HDLC based communication profile
- IEC 62056-8-3:2013 Communication profile for PLC S-FSK neighbourhood networks
- IEC 62056-8-5:2017 Narrow-band OFDM G3-PLC communication profile for neighbourhood networks
- IEC 62056-8-6:2017 High speed PLC ISO/IEC 12139-1 profile for neighbourhood networks
- IEC TS 62056-8-20:2016 Mesh communication profile for neighbourhood networks
- IEC TS 62056-9-1:2016 Communication profile using web-services to access a DLMS/COSEM server via a COSEM Access Service (CAS)
- IEC 62056-9-7:2013 Communication profile for TCP-UDP/IP networks

Other IEC 62056 parts deal with Electricity metering - Data exchange for meter reading, tariff and load control

- IEC 62056-21:2002 Direct local data exchange
- IEC TS 62056-41:1998 Data exchange using wide area networks: Public switched telephone network (PSTN) with LINK+ protocol
- IEC 62056-42:2002 Physical layer services and procedures for connection-oriented asynchronous data exchange
- IEC 62056-46:2002+AMD1:2006 Data link layer using HDLC protocol
- IEC 62056-47:2006 COSEM transport layers for IPv4 networks
- IEC TS 62056-51:1998 Application layer protocols
- IEC TS 62056-52:1998 Communication protocols management distribution line message specification (DLMS) server
- IEC 62056-61:2002 Object identification system (OBIS)

== Interface classes ==
In DLMS/COSEM, all the data in electronic meters and devices are represented by means of mapping them to appropriate classes and related attribute values. Any real-world thing mapped to an appropriate class type can be described by the attributes defined in the standard, and the methods defined therewith allow operations to be performed on the attributes. The attributes and methods constitute an object. Conventionally, the first attribute in an object is the logical name, also defined as the OBIS code in the case of LN referencing. It is one part of the identification of the object. Objects that share common characteristics are generalized as instantiations of an interface class with defined class_id. Instantiations of an interface class are called COSEM objects. IEC 62056-62 defines nineteen interface classes for the COSEM object model.

== IEC 62056-21 ==
IEC 61107 or currently IEC 62056-21, was an international standard for a computer protocol to read utility meters. It is designed to operate over any media, including the Internet. A meter sends ASCII (in modes A..D) or HDLC (mode E) data to a nearby hand-held unit (HHU) using a serial port. The physical media are usually either modulated light, sent with an LED and received with a photodiode, or a pair of wires, usually modulated by a 20mA current loop. The protocol is usually half-duplex.

The following exchange usually takes a second or two, and occurs when a person from the utility company presses a meter-reading gun against a transparent faceplate on the meter, or plugs into the metering bus at the mailbox of an apartment building.

The general protocol consists of a "sign on" sequence, in which a handheld unit identifies itself to the metering unit. During sign-on, the handheld unit addresses a particular meter by number. The meter and hand-held unit negotiate various parameters such as the maximum frame length during transmission and reception, whether multiple frames can be sent without acknowledging individual frames (windowing), the fastest communication rate that they can both manage (only in the case of mode E switching to HDLC) etc.

Next, the meter informs the handheld unit about the various parameters that are available with it in various security settings, viz. the 'no-security logical group', ' the low-security logical groups' and 'the high-security logical groups'.

If the parameter required is in the no-security group, just a get.request will provide the HHU with the desired response. If the parameter required is in the low-security group, a password authentication of the HHU is required before information can be read.

In case of high-security parameters, the meter challenges the handheld unit with a cryptographic password. The handheld unit must return an encrypted password. If the password exchange is correct, the meter accepts the handheld unit: it is "signed on."

After signing on, the handheld unit generally reads a meter description. This describes some registers that describe the current count of metered units (i.e. kilowatt-hours, megajoules, litres of gas or water) and the metering unit's reliability (is it still operating correctly?). Occasionally, a manufacturer will define a new quantity to measure, and in this case, a new or different data type will appear in the meter definition. Most metering units have special modes for calibration and resetting meter registers. These modes are usually protected by anti-tampering features such as switches that sense if the meter enclosure has been opened.

The HHU may also be given limited rights to set or reset certain parameters in the meter.

The handheld unit then sends a sign-off message. If no sign-off message is sent, the meter automatically signs off after a previously negotiated time interval after the last message.

== Generic Companion Profile (GCP) ==
The GCP provides a common framework for communication between meters and data collection systems, ensuring interoperability across different manufacturers and devices. It defines a set of basic objects, services, and communication methods for exchanging metering data, including energy consumption, demand measurements, and meter status.

== See also ==
- ANSI C12.18
- Automatic meter reading
- Electricity meter
- OpenHAN
