= Rushmore Reviews =

- Industry: Oil and gas industry
- Founded: 1993
- Headquarters: Aberdeen, Scotland
- Area served: Global
- Key people: Peter Rushmore (Managing Director), Helen Rushmore (Sales and Marketing Director)
- Products: Shale Performance Review (SPR), Drilling Performance Review (DPR), Completions Performance Review (CPR), Abandonment Performance Review (APR), Interventions Performance Review (IPR), Rushmore Drilling Index & Estimated Drilling Days(RDI), Rushmore Drilling Index & Estimated Drilling Days(REDD)
- Number of employees: 25
- Website: rushmorereviews.com

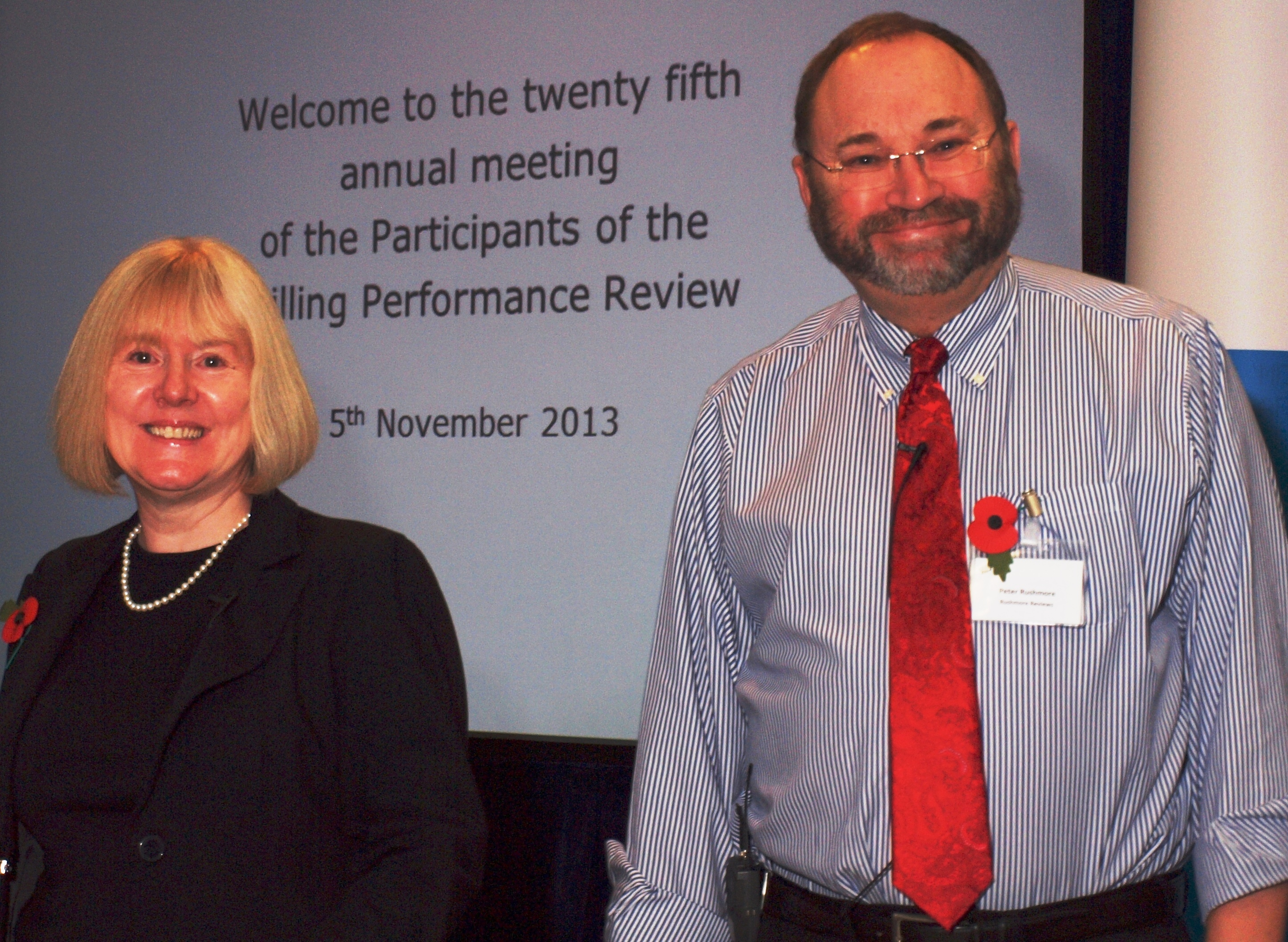
An image from the 25th Anniversary Meetings, held in Aberdeen in November 2013.

The Rushmore Reviews is a service provided by IHS Markit that collects, analyzes and publishes offset well data for participating operators in the petroleum industry. The content of their extensive, global database is exclusively available to Review participants, who are then able to use the shared data to benchmark their own performance against others in the industry.

== History ==
The Reviews began in 1993 when a group of oil operators, led by BP, outsourced the production of the data collection and analysis project they had been conducting since 1988 to the Rushmore Reviews. This was a joint venture between two independent companies, Rushmore Associates Ltd (founded by Peter and Helen Rushmore) and the Sigma Consultancy (founded by Tim Stapenhurst and wife Pat). They shared offices and provided data to participants through a web-based portal. The Sigma Consultancy was purchased from the Stapenhursts on 30 April 2010, by Peter and Helen Rushmore, leaving the Rushmores the sole owners of the Rushmore Reviews.

Participants meet annually in Aberdeen, Scotland to discuss and agree any changes to the data being shared and the rules under which it is shared. The 2013 annual meetings, hosted by both Helen and Peter Rushmore, marked 25 years of the Reviews, and 20 years since the outsourcing to Rushmore Reviews.

== Growth of the Reviews ==
Initially in 1989 the Reviews consisted of twelve operators, who agreed a process for sharing offset drilling data for the first time. A standard set of metrics and definitions were employed by all twelve, and quality control was added to ensure the data was sufficiently reliable to be of real use to them. This became known as the Drilling Performance Review (DPR). Until 1993 the DPR was managed by the Operators themselves. However this was not a core activity for them and it was agreed that the DPR would be outsourced to Rushmore Reviews, who worked to increase the scope of the Reviews, as requested by the existing participants. Eventually the DPR grew to hold data for more than 50,000 wells.

The participants meet annually in Aberdeen to consider the Reviews and discuss/agree upon any revisions they require for the following year, ensuring that the Reviews continue to evolve and grow. 1994 saw the establishment of the Completions Performance Review (CPR), now containing information and schematics on the completion of over 12,000 offset wells in over 60 countries. Following an increasing number of well abandonments, demand grew among participants for the Abandonment Performance Review (APR) which began in 2008. The APR contains data for over 300 permanently abandoned wells, mainly situated in Europe.

In 2011 the Interventions Performance Review (IPR) was initiated after new products and services available in the industry increased the productivity of interventions for some participants of other Reviews, yet there was no performance benchmarking available in this area.

The Shale Performance Review (SPR), starting in 2012 contains information on the drilling, completion and frac'ing of offset multi-stage frac’ed wells. The SPR dataset includes multiple reservoir types, such as shale, sandstone, carbonate, siltstone, limestone and others. Over 7,000 wells drilled since 2011 are included, covering Canada, USA, Argentina, Australia, China, Colombia, Jordan, Indonesia, Poland and Sweden.

In an increasingly competitive industry, benchmarking has grown popular amongst oil and gas Operators, explaining why participation in the Rushmore Reviews has grown steadily. The dataset contains a large amount of offset well data encompassing drilling, completions, shale, interventions and abandonments. As of 2013, the Reviews contain data for over 50,000 wells, from conventional hydrocarbon to shale and coal seam gas wells. Over 100 countries feature in the Reviews, and the vast majority of Operating companies have made contributions.

From 2012, Rushmore Reviews now hold a second set of annual meetings in Houston Texas for participants in the Shale Performance Review which continues to grow rapidly, with the notable addition of Chesapeake Energy to the Review in 2014; the second-largest natural gas producer in the United States.

== IHS Acquisition ==
On 5 February 2015, Denver based IHS acquired Rushmore Reviews.

== Participant Website Tools ==
Participants of the Reviews are provided with secure website access in order to view offset well data. The data is searchable and can be filtered by the user. The data may also be downloaded in Excel format. Additionally there are a range of analytical tools available to study the data. These include performance metrics (P10, P25, P50, P75, P90, Min, Mean, Max etc.) as well as the facility to draw a range of different chart types.

Amongst the collection of tools, the Rushmore Drilling Index and Rushmore Drilling Index & Estimated Drilling Days, both designed and owned by the company, are particularly noteworthy. Designed as objective tools for well planning, they index the difficulty and indicate the amount of time a planned well is likely to take to drill to target depth.

== Countries included in the Reviews ==
Below, an illustration showing the global coverage of the Reviews in the darker colour.

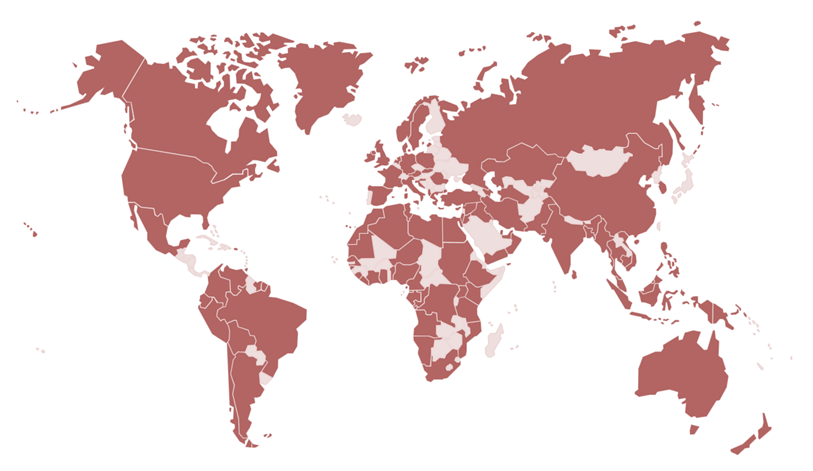

Albania	Algeria	Angola	Argentina
Australia	Austria	Azerbaijan	Bahrain
Bangladesh	Benin	Bolivia	Brazil
Brunei	Cambodia	Cameroon	Canada
Chile	China	Colombia	Republic of the Congo
Democratic Republic of the Congo	Croatia	Cyprus	Denmark
Ecuador	Egypt	Equatorial Guinea	Ethiopia
Falkland Islands	Faroe Islands	France	French Guiana
Gabon	Germany	Ghana	Greece
Greenland	Guinea-Bissau	India	Indonesia
Iran	Iraq	Ireland	Israel
Italy	Ivory Coast	Jordan	Kazakhstan
Kenya	Liberia	Libya	Madagascar
Malaysia	Mauritania	Mexico	Morocco
Mozambique	Myanmar	Namibia	Netherlands
New Zealand	Niger	Nigeria	Norway
Oman	Pakistan	Palestine	Papua New Guinea
Peru	Philippines	Poland	Qatar
Romania	Russia	Sakhalin Island	Senegal
Sierra Leone	Slovakia	South Africa	South Korea
Spain	Sri Lanka	Sudan	Suriname
Sweden	Suriname	Syria	Tanzania
Thailand	Timor-Leste	Trinidad and Tobago	Tunisia
Turkey	Turkmenistan	United Arab Emirates	Abu Dhabi
UAE Dubai	Sharjah (emirate)	Uganda	United Kingdom
United States	Venezuela	Vietnam	Yemen

== A selection of participating Operators ==
Afren	Agiba (Eni)	Anadarko	Apache	Arrow	Bapetco (Shell)
Bayerngas	BG	BHP	BP	BP Block 18	BP Block 31
BP Exploration	BP Tangguh	Burren (Eni)	Cabinda Gulf (Chevron)	Cairn	Carigali (Petronas)
Centrica	Cepsa	Chesapeake	Chevron	Chevron AMBU	Chevron CICo KLO
Chevron MCA	Chevron SJV	Chrysaor	CNR	ConocoPhillips	Dana (KNOC)
Det norske	E.ON	Endeavour	Eni	Eni Gas Land	Eni Gas Offshore
Eni North Africa	Eni Oil	EnQuest	EOG	Equion	Fairfield
Faroe	FCP (Eni)	Gaz de France	GUPCO (DragonOil)	Hess	Ithaca
JV Gas (Statoil)	Kosmos	Maersk	Marathon	Mubadala	Murphy
NAE (Eni)	NAM (Shell)	NAOC (Eni)	Newfield	Nexen (CNOOC)	Noble Energy
Noreco	Oando	Occidental	Occidental Mukhaizna	Occidental SWL	Ørsted
OMV	Origin	PanAmerican (BP)	PanAmerican Deep (BP)	PanAmerican Landlite (BP)	PanAtlantic
PDO (Shell)	Perenco	Petrobel (Eni)	Petrobras	Petrofac	Premier
PTTEP	QGC (CSG) (BG)	Repsol (Repsol-YPF)	Repsol UNAR	Roc Oil Bohai	Sakhalin Energy (Shell)
Salym (Shell)	Samson	Santos	Sasol	Shell	SNEPCO (Shell)
SPDC (Shell)	Statoil	Suncor	Talisman	Tengizchevroil (Chevron)	Total
Tullow	VICO (BP)	Wintershall	Woodside		
