= Jim Zockoll =

American businessman within franchising (1930–2024)

James Francis Zockoll (14 February 1930 – 25 January 2024) was an American-born pilot and businessman who pioneered franchising in the United Kingdom, founding the Dyno-Rod drain repair business in 1963.

== Early life ==
The youngest of Fred and Margaret Zockoll's six children, Jim Zockoll was born and grew up in North Braddock near Pittsburgh, Pennsylvania. He graduated from Scott High School in 1949 and immediately joined the US Air Force, where he served as an aircraft mechanic crew chief in the Korean War.

Following service, Zockoll returned to the US and attended the Pittsburgh Institute of Aeronautics to expand his mechanical skills and obtain his Aircraft and Engine license. He also enrolled in flying school. In 1955, he got a job as a flight engineer with Pan American World Airways (Pan Am), working on DC6 and DC7 aircraft.

When Pan Am introduced Boeing 707s in the late 1950s, engineers were no longer needed on every flight. Feeling his job was insecure, Zockoll began a couple of sidelines: he invested in rental properties on Long Island and started a small drain-cleaning business.

== Franchising career ==
In December 1963, during a crew stopover at The Kensington Gardens Hotel in London, the hotel's manager had a problem with blocked drains under the hotel's ballroom that would need a lengthy repair at a cost of 40,000 guineas (equivalent to £1m in 2024). Zockoll flew back to the US to get his electro-mechanical drain-cleaning machine – equipment which was unknown in the UK – and cleared it in 20 minutes.

Zockoll spotted a business opportunity, moved his family to London and, with support from his father-in-law and the hotel's plumber, founded Surbiton-based Dyno-Rod.

Zockoll used a franchising model – also then unknown in the UK – to expand the business. It was the UK’s first non-fast food franchising business. Franchisees paid a fee and up to 30% of sales revenue for the franchise, equipment, van and advertising. Zockoll also introduced further US franchises into the UK, and in 1977, Dyno-Rod became the founding member of the British Franchise Association (BFA). The company's experience helped to lay the foundation of good practice for the industry and encouraged other franchises to join.

During this time Zockoll continued working as a pilot for Pan Am, enjoying the security and glamour of flying. He told The Times: "I am also a restless soul. I just could not stay here and do the day-to-day running of the business. Flying enables me to get around Europe and think up and develop ideas.” In 1983, he took early retirement from the airline to focus on his expanding business.

By July 2004, Dyno-Rod had around 167 franchises, including emergency plumbing, locksmith services (Dyno-Lock), pest control (Dyno-Kil) and burglary repairs (Dyno-Secure), and a turnover of £60m. The parent group, Dyno Group, started to plan an initial public offering worth up to £50m ($92.8m) to fund a £60.5m buy-out of the business from Zockoll. However, in October 2004, Zockoll sold Dyno-Rod to Centrica, the owner of British Gas, for £57.6 million.

Talking about the sale, Zockoll told The Times:

"My lucky break was realising this industry existed in the US but not in the UK. I invested £20,000 savings into getting Dyno-Rod off the ground and I still had my income as a pilot. I was really confident that it was going to be a success. It took the country by storm. People were amazed that we turned up within the hour and had the drains cleared in no time at all."

Zockoll became a British citizen in 2017. He continued working as chairman of the Zockoll Group, his franchising and licensing business, up until his death in 2024.

== Personal life and death ==
Zockoll died on 25 January 2024, at the age of 93. He was survived by his wife Ann, who he had met in England, and sons Steven and Jim.
