= Sandbank Offshore Wind Farm =

Offshore wind farm in Germany

Sandbank
- Country: Germany
- Coordinates: 55°11′N 6°51′E
- Status: Operational
- Commission date: 2017
- Owners: Stadtwerke München; Vattenfall

Wind farm
- Type: Offshore
- Distance from shore: 90 km (56 mi)
- Rotor diameter: 130 m (430 ft)
- Site area: 60 km^{2} (23 sq mi)

Power generation
- Units operational: 72 × 4 MW
- Make and model: Siemens Gamesa Renewable Energy SWT-4.0-130 (72)
- Nameplate capacity: 288 MW

External links
- Website: powerplants.vattenfall.com/sandbank/

Wind farm layout

Sandbank's location in the wind farms of the German Bight

Sandbank is an offshore wind farm in the German part of the North Sea. It is located 90 km off the coast of the German state of Schleswig-Holstein. The wind farm consists of 72 Siemens wind turbines with a capacity of 4 MW each, giving the farm a total capacity of 288 MW. The wind farm was completed in 2017.

The SylWin transformer platform connects the power from DanTysk, Butendiek and Sandbank offshore wind farm to shore.

== See also ==
- Wind power in Germany
- List of offshore wind farms in Germany
