= Roy Gardner (businessman) =

British businessman

Sir Roy Gardner
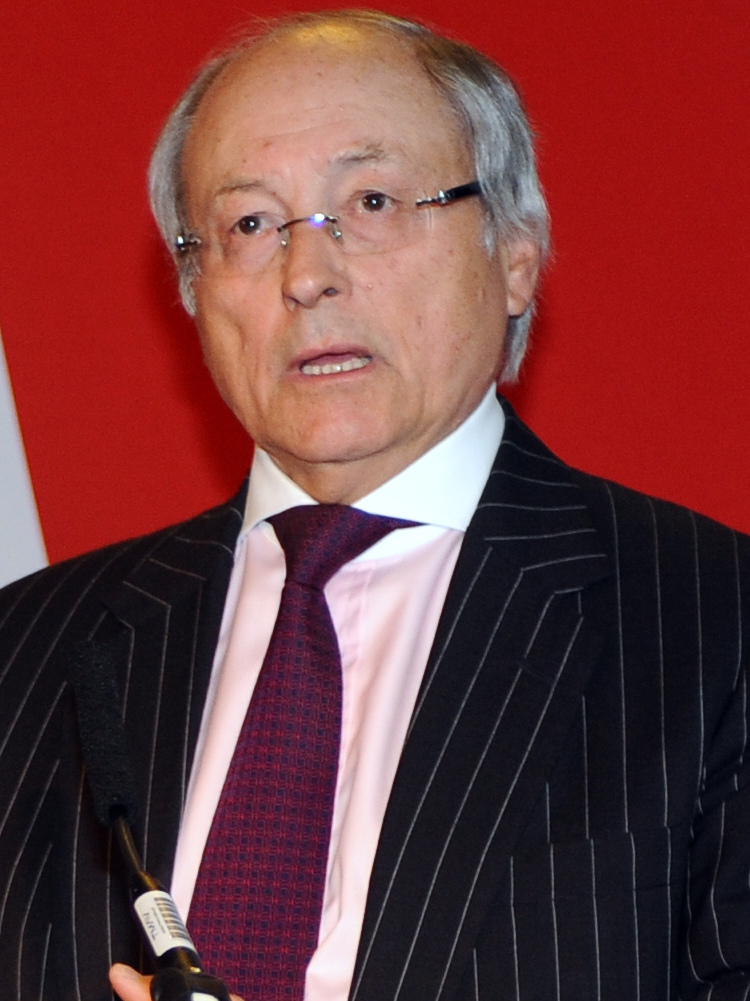
- Born: 20 August 1945 (age 80); Brentford, England
- Education: Strode's College
- Occupation: Businessman

Sir Roy Alan Gardner (born 20 August 1945) is a British businessman. He is a former director of English football clubs Manchester United and Plymouth Argyle. While at Manchester United, he was involved in the sale of the club to American businessman Malcolm Glazer before resigning in protest at the sale. His time as chairman of Plymouth Argyle resulted in the club entering administration with debts of over £17 million and accusations of financial mismanagement.

== Early life and education ==
Born in Brentford, he was the eldest son of a carpenter, Roy Thomas Gardner, and his wife Iris Joan (née Paine) and was brought up in Middlesex and Surrey in humble surroundings. He initially wanted to be a professional footballer, and supported Manchester United from the age of 8. He went to Strode's School (a grammar school, which became Strode's College in 1975) in Surrey. In the holidays he worked at Wall's.

== Career ==
=== BAC and GEC ===
Gardner started his career at the British Aircraft Corporation through their accounting apprentice scheme, working in the Commercial Aircraft Division from 1963 to 1975. He joined the Marconi Company Ltd in 1975. From 1979 to 1985, he was Group Finance Director of the Marconi Space and Defence part of the company. From January 1986 he was the Finance Director of Standard Telephones and Cables (STC plc). He became managing director of STC Communication Systems. Nortel took over STC in 1991 and he became chief operating officer of Northern Telecom Europe. He then became managing director of GEC Marconi Ltd, succeeding Arnold Weinstock from 1992 to 1994.

=== Centrica ===
Gardner joined British Gas in November 1994 as executive director, finance and was involved in splitting the company into two parts. He was the chief executive of Centrica plc from February 1997 (when it first formed when British Gas demerged) until October 2005. Under his leadership, Centrica bought the AA. He was replaced by Sam Laidlaw. During his time with Centrica, he was listed in the Harvard Business Review's Best-Performing CEOs in the World.

=== Non-executive roles ===
In 2001, Gardner was appointed as chairman by Mainstream Renewable Power, the privately held renewable energy development company with wind projects in England, Scotland, Germany and South Africa. In July 2006, Gardner became non-executive chairman of Compass Group plc, the British multinational contract food service, cleaning, property management and support services company. He retired from this role in 2014. He has also been non-executive chairman of Connaught plc, the FTSE 250 support services company. He was chairman of Enserve, the infrastructure services company in the UK, operating in the electricity, water and analytics sectors, from its inception in 2010 until 2014.

In 2014, he joined the board of William Hill as senior independent non-executive director, serving as a member of the Audit and Risk, Remuneration, Nomination and Corporate Responsibility Committees. In 2015, Gardner became chairman of Serco, the British outsourcing company which operates public and private transport and traffic control, aviation, military weapons, detention centres, prisons and schools. In May 2020 it was announced that Gardner would step down from his role as Serco chairman and a search for his replacement had begun. He was a director at Willis Towers Watson until January 2016 and is currently a Senior Adviser to Credit Suisse, providing counsel to clients in a variety of sectors including energy, utilities, industrials and leisure and services.

=== Other roles ===
Sir Roy is the chairman of the advisory board of the Energy Futures Lab at Imperial College London. He has chaired the Apprenticeship Ambassadors Network and is a Fellow of the Association of Chartered Certified Accountants, the Royal Aeronautical Society, and the Royal Society of Arts. He is a companion of the Chartered Management Institute.

In June 2007 he became President of the Energy Institute. In 2008, he was awarded an honorary doctorate by Thames Valley University. The same year he was named 27th Most Powerful Executive in the retail industry by The Telegraph. Gardner is also a Fellow of the City and Guilds Institute and a governor at St Albans School.

=== Charitable activities ===
Gardner raised £80,000 climbing Mount Kilimanjaro for the Carers Association, of which he was president. He has also been a council member of the Prince's Youth Business Trust and chairman of the Employers' Federation on Disability as well as a Trustee of the Development Trust for the Disabled. He is also on the board of the Combat Stress charity, the Veterans mental health charity.

== Football career ==
=== Manchester United ===
Gardner became a director of Manchester United in December 1999. He was appointed as non-executive chairman of Manchester United plc in November 2001, taking over from Sir Roland Smith on 31 March 2002. In April 2005, he and the Manchester United board issued a statement recommending against the proposed buyout by Malcolm Glazer and his family, saying the "proposed capital structure […] still contains more leverage [debt] than the board would consider prudent"; however, they were forced to issue a contrary statement a month later, once the Glazers had acquired enough shares to constitute a majority stake in the club. Gardner resigned as chairman in June 2005, shortly after the Glazer takeover, as did his fellow non-executive directors Jim O'Neill and Ian Mutch. In 2010, Gardner reiterated his criticism of the method the Glazers used to purchase Manchester United, describing it as not "a sustainable model".

=== Plymouth Argyle ===
In July 2009, Gardner and business partner Keith Todd secured ownership of 13 percent of Championship team Plymouth Argyle as part of a consortium of international and local businesses which took over the club. He stated that it was the consortium's ambition to see Argyle promoted to the English Premier League within five years and focused on the club's bid to host the World Cup finals in 2018. Gardner also stated that he wished to "develop a better understanding of the club's precise needs, plan to progressively increase the budget for new players, in particular as we grow the commercial income of the club".

During Gardner's chairmanship, the football club was issued with a number of winding up orders over unpaid taxes and debts. It entered a repayment strategy, involving the sale of players Reda Johnson and Craig Noone. In March 2010, the club announced that Home Park was to be transferred to the holding company owned by Gardner, Todd and Yasuaki Kagami. Gardner stated that no money would go directly to the club and that the £7.5 million received would be used to pay off the club's debts. This included the money owed to directors. Gardner, Todd and their co-investors spent more than £3m in an attempt to save the club. Gardner himself almost trebled his stake. Kagami said the directors were “fighting tooth and nail to make sure the club does not go into administration.” Gardner resigned as chairman on 27 December 2010 and the club entered administration shortly afterwards. The club formally exited administration on 31 October 2011 but only after Plymouth City Council agreed to re-purchase the stadium and other land belonging to the club was sold to local entrepreneur James Brent. The club was close to being liquidated after 125 years of history whilst staff had been without pay for almost a year.

== Honours ==
He was knighted in the 2002 Queen's Birthday Honours List for services to the gas and electricity industries.

Business positions
New creation	Centrica plc chief executive 1997–2005	Succeeded by Sam Laidlaw
Preceded by Paul Stapleton	Plymouth Argyle F.C. chairman 2009–2010	Succeeded by Peter Ridsdale (acting)
