= 2021 British Gas strike =

Labour strike by British Gas workers

The 2021 British Gas strike was a labour strike by British Gas workers in the United Kingdom. The workers, represented by the GMB union, opposed British Gas' "fire and rehire" plans, where the company planned mass layoffs of employees, with the goal of ultimately rehiring them on less favourable contracts without having to negotiate over terms.

== Background ==
British Gas is an energy and home services provider in the United Kingdom, a subsidiary of Centrica. It serves around 12 million homes in the United Kingdom, the biggest energy supplier in the country, and is considered one of the Big Six dominating the gas and electricity market in the United Kingdom. In 2020, the company had around 27,000 employees, 20,000 of which are based in the UK, including 7,500 service engineers.

In recent years, British Gas has seen a relative decline in fortunes. The British Gas brand lost 750,000 domestic customers in 2017 amid intense competition, contributing to a February 2018 announcement that 4,000 jobs would be cut. In June 2020, Centrica announced that it would fire 5,000 staff, saying that it was necessary "to arrest our decline."

== Strike ==
Later in 2020, Centrica told British Gas engineers that it wanted to change the terms of their contracts and would only accept a short negotiating period, or else it would fire most of the engineers on 1 April 2021 and rehire them on Centrica-dictated contracts. In August 2020, the GMB held a consultative ballot on a potential strike, with 95% of workers voting in favour. In October 2020, Centrica announced that it would no longer negotiate and would proceed with the fire-and-rehire plans if the workers did not accept its terms, which would see engineers forced to work an additional three hours each week, would eliminate higher rates of pay for work hours on weekends and holidays, and would reduce notice for the summer and winter shifts rosters, among other changes. Some workers would lose up to £12,000 annually in pay. The GMB subsequently held a vote among the workers, with 89% voting to reject Centrica's terms. In its December 2020 preliminary results, British Gas reported profits of £80m. Centrica also received £27m from the government's Coronavirus Job Retention Scheme.

On 7 January, thousands of British Gas workers across the United Kingdom walked off the job, beginning a two-week strike. In late January, Welsh Labour and Cooperative Party MP Stephen Doughty told the House of Commons that Centrica had issued section 188 notices to its staff in July 2020, before negotiations had started, despite Centrica CEO Chris O'Shea's public assurances to the contrary. At the end of January, as Centrica remained committed to its fire-and-rehire plans, the union extended the strike through February.

In mid-February, the GMB paused the strike temporarily after Centrica offered to re-enter negotiations. That month, however, Centrica announced changes to the salary deductions for industrial action, which one engineer described as:

Typically, a month’s payroll in British Gas is paid in the middle of the month and includes overtime accrued from the first few days. But in February the company announced that industrial action taken up to the 8th would be deducted from that month’s pay, instead of March’s paypacket. This put the company in a curious position of deducting strike pay for those taking action on 8 February, but not paying overtime for those who chose to work that day providing emergency cover. Incredibly, some engineers even went into negative pay. Many of us felt this was a new low – an attempt to hit the morale of engineers who had already suffered eight months of sleepless nights over the threat of fire and rehire. The bitterness felt by workers who have given years of their life to this company can’t be overestimated.

By the end of February, after 22 days of strike, the union estimated that up to 300,000 planned annual service visits had had to be cancelled. British Gas, however, refused to back down from the fire and rehire plans. The GMB then announced that the strike would continue. In March, a 38 Degrees petition against British Gas' fire-and-rehire policy gathered over 50,000 signatures.

On 16 April, around 500 engineers, 2% of the British Gas workforce, were fired after refusing to replace their contracts with one that included less pay and more hours. The GMB accused British Gas of "the largest mass dismissal in living memory," saying that the pay cuts amounted to 15% in real terms.

On 18 May, the GMB revealed that HM Revenue and Customs had put the fired engineers on the self-assessment tax code, incorrectly added an additional £1,000 to their tax bills. It was also revealed that O'Shea's salary had increased from £675,000 to £775,000 and that he had been awarded £2 million in shares.

In July 2021, the GMB announced that it was calling off the strike, stating that 75% of workers had voted to accept a new pay deal that would limit the number of unsocial hours a worker could be scheduled for and would improve pay for those hours. Later that month, Centrica announced British Gas had more than doubled its profits for the first six months of 2021 compared to 2020, up to £172 million.

== Reactions ==
Journalist Owen Jones stated that the strikers "have succeeded in raising the profile of this grim means of undercutting rights" and that "British Gas was a jewel in the crown of Britain’s privatisation programme of the 1980s and 90s, a nationally respected institution. Today, it is a byword for rip-off services and now a poster boy for tawdry treatment of workers." On 9 May, a Survation poll commissioned by the GMB found that 76% of the British public believed that fire and rehire schemes should be illegal.

== See also ==
- Strikes during the COVID-19 pandemic
- 2021 Go North West strike
