= Board game café =

Themed café involving board games

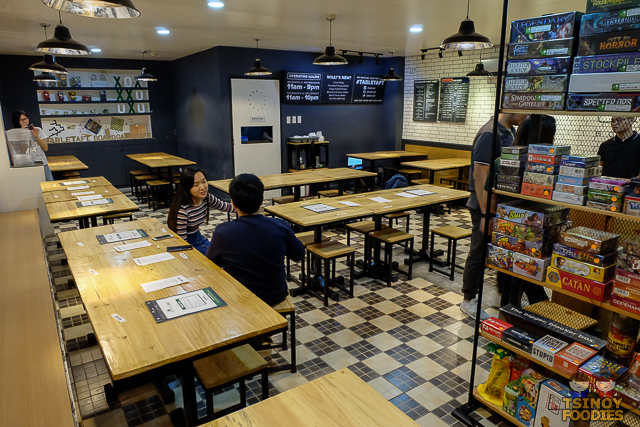
Table Taft Board Game Café, located in Manila, with a shelf of board games (right)

A board game café is a type of café in which patrons play board and card games while being served food and drink. Customers usually pay an entry fee or rent a table in order to access a large library of games and instruction from the staff on how to play them. Many board game cafés also sell the games.

== History ==
Board game cafés seem to have begun in South Korea; in 2004, Seoul had 130 board game cafés. This was followed by many other large cities in East Asia, and by 2012, there were estimated to be more than 200 cafés in Beijing. Many of these cafés offered 24 hours of gaming, instructions from staff and free drinks for around 30 yuan.

While it was not the first board game café in North America, Snakes and Lattes in Toronto, established in 2010, is often credited with proliferating the idea of board game cafés to various entrepreneurs in the city and the western world. These include Draughts in London, Thirsty Meeples in Oxford, the Tabletop Board Game Café in Cleveland, Loot & XP in Oklahoma, Small Print on Prince Edward Island, and Bonus Round Games in Chicago. Snakes and Lattes' business model was replicated in many of these cafés. In 2016, over 5,000 board game cafés opened in the U.S. alone.

== Clientele ==
Board game cafés often cater to a wide audience of all ages, particularly to people unfamiliar with the hobby. They tend to be more successful in attracting newcomers to board games than board game hobby shops, although they are also frequented by experienced hobbyists. Customers in board game cafés can include dating couples, groups of students, as well as veteran regulars.

== Asia ==
=== India ===
Board game cafés in India were becoming popular in early 2020, with the establishment of The Board Room and The Board Game Lounge in Chennai, Creeda BGC (2015) and Pair A Dice (2017) in Mumbai, Dice N Dine in Bangalore and Board'em in Gurgaon. Shasn, Mantri Cards, Manifesto, and The Poll: The Great Indian Election Game are Indian board games that feature in many of these premises.

=== Iran ===
According to Polygon, privately owned businesses such as board game cafés have become "safe havens" for Iranian youth against the Ministry of Culture and Islamic Guidance (often referred to as the "morality police"), and board game cafés in particular were said to "provide excellent escapism". Dressage Café in Tehran is one such establishment which involves playthroughs of Dungeons & Dragons and Mafia as well as a library of mostly Iranian board games.

=== Japan ===
Jelly Jelly Cafe is a large board game café chain across Japan, led by Sho Shirasaka. Its first venue was established in Shibuya in 2011, and in 2016 the company began to expand its venues. In 2018, the company supervised the establishment of an in-house café for the mobile game company Delightworks, aiming to induce creativity in the company. Jelly Jelly Cafe opened its 13th venue in 2022. To protect its games, the café only serves drinks. It has a target audience of regular college students and office workers.

A Japanese manga series, After School Dice Club, depicting a group of teenage girls and their efforts to set up a board game café, was first released in 2013 and released as an anime in 2019.

=== Singapore ===
The Mind Cafe was a chain of board game cafés in Singapore. It established an international outlet in New Delhi in 2012. In April 2026, The Mind Cafe announced the closure of its flagship store in Singapore which ran for 21 years.

=== South Korea ===
Korean cafés often discourage the play of classic titles popular with the older generations, such as Mahjong and Go-Stop, because they risk the cafés needing gambling licenses and are seen as generally lowbrow.

The Dice Latte in Seoul, which opened in 2015, sells western comic books alongside access to tabletop gaming. It developed this model to support its business when in-store gaming activities decreased during the COVID-19 pandemic.

== Europe ==
=== The Netherlands ===
Spellenhuis opened in 2017 in Haarlem with a board game cafe and store. In 2020 they opened a second location in Den Haag.

=== Poland ===
Board game cafes became popular in Poland in the late 2010s, with many cities and towns in Poland sporting several such venues.

=== United Kingdom ===
Thirsty Meeples opened in Oxford in July 2013 as the UK's first board game café, directly inspired by Snakes and Lattes. In 2014, it had more than 1,000 visitors per week. By 2015, it stocked over 2,000 board games.

Geek Retreat, first founded in Glasgow in May 2013, is a chain of franchised combined gaming hobby shops in the UK that later adopted the structure of a games café. It joined the British Franchise Association in 2021, and by June 2021, it had 27 venues. Entry is free but guests are asked to purchase food and drink.

Established in 2014, Draughts was the first café to open in London. It has two locations, in Hackney and Waterloo, both of which were originally situated under railway arches. It allows a £5 entry fee for 4 hours of gaming, and offers craft beer, cocktails, and a food menu named after various board games.

Chance & Counters is a chain of cafés based in Bristol since 2016, with branches in Cardiff and Birmingham. It has received significant funding from entertainment company The Yogscast as well as game company Ndemic Creations.

== North America ==
=== Canada ===
Snakes and Lattes, a chain headquartered in Toronto, is one of the largest board game café chains in North America. Originally, Wi-Fi was intentionally not available at the first café. In 2014, the chain opened the board game bar Snakes and Lagers, later Snakes & Lattes College, which offers alcoholic drinks as well as coffee.

In 2018, YouTuber and animator Domics opened Domics' GG Gaming Café, a board game café in Mississauga.

=== United States ===
The Brooklyn Strategist is a café in Brooklyn, opened by neuroscientist Jon Freeman in 2010. It is focused on attracting children for after-school activities, and school administrators in the area have recommended that children visit the café. Parents pay for their children to be taught how to play board games at the venue, developing their socialization and problem-solving skills. The venue shifts toward an adult crowd at night.

The Uncommons is allegedly Manhattan's first board game coffee shop, established in 2013. It was supported by a Kickstarter funding campaign, and claims to be the largest board game library on the East Coast. Co-founder of the business Greg May also co-owns Hex & Co, another café in Manhattan with two large uptown locations.

The Chicago Board Game Cafe was a restaurant, bar, gaming venue, and retail shop created by the team behind Cards Against Humanity and opened in February 2020. It served Vietnamese, Mexican, and Spanish dishes. In September, the company sold the location to Snakes and Lattes, citing a lack of "expertise" and the impact of the COVID-19 pandemic.

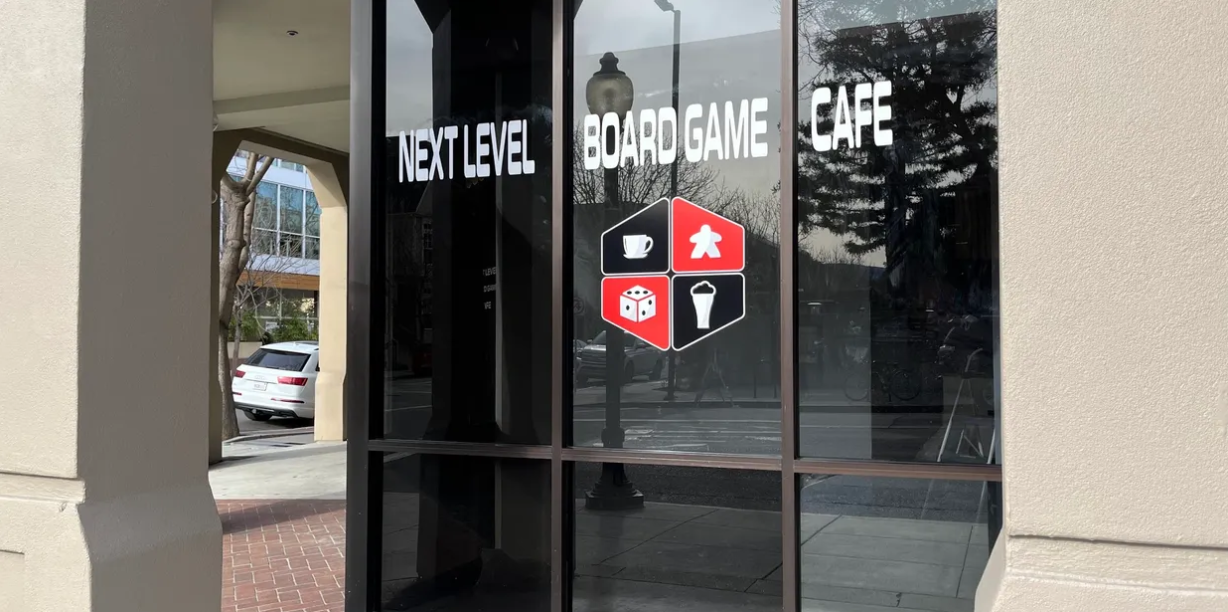
AA Board Game Cafe LLC intends to rebrand Next Level Board Game Cafe in late-2026

Located in the heart of Silicon Valley, Next Level Board Game Cafe was the first board game cafe to open in Mountain View, CA. Established in late-2023, the cafe boasted a library of over 600 titles and developed a stellar community of South Bay board game hobbyists before the owners were forced to close their doors in March 2026. AA Board Game Cafe LLC, which is co-owned by former community member Alfred Tarng and former Next Level employees Chris Ferejohn and Angelo Mendoza, intends to rebrand the cafe and reopen its doors in late-2026.

== See also ==
- Cat café
- Craft café
- Internet café
- LAN gaming center
- Amusement arcade
