= Geek Retreat =

British chain of shops and cafés

- Industry: Retail store, event space & café
- Headquarters: Glasgow, Scotland
- Number of locations: 16 stores (2026)
- Area served: England, Scotland, Wales & Northern Ireland
- Website: https://geek-retreat.com/

Geek Retreat is a chain of franchised combined shops and game cafés in the United Kingdom. The venues offer food, drink, and have various items for sale, while also providing a space to play board games, console games and trading card games. The venues also hold regular events.

== History ==
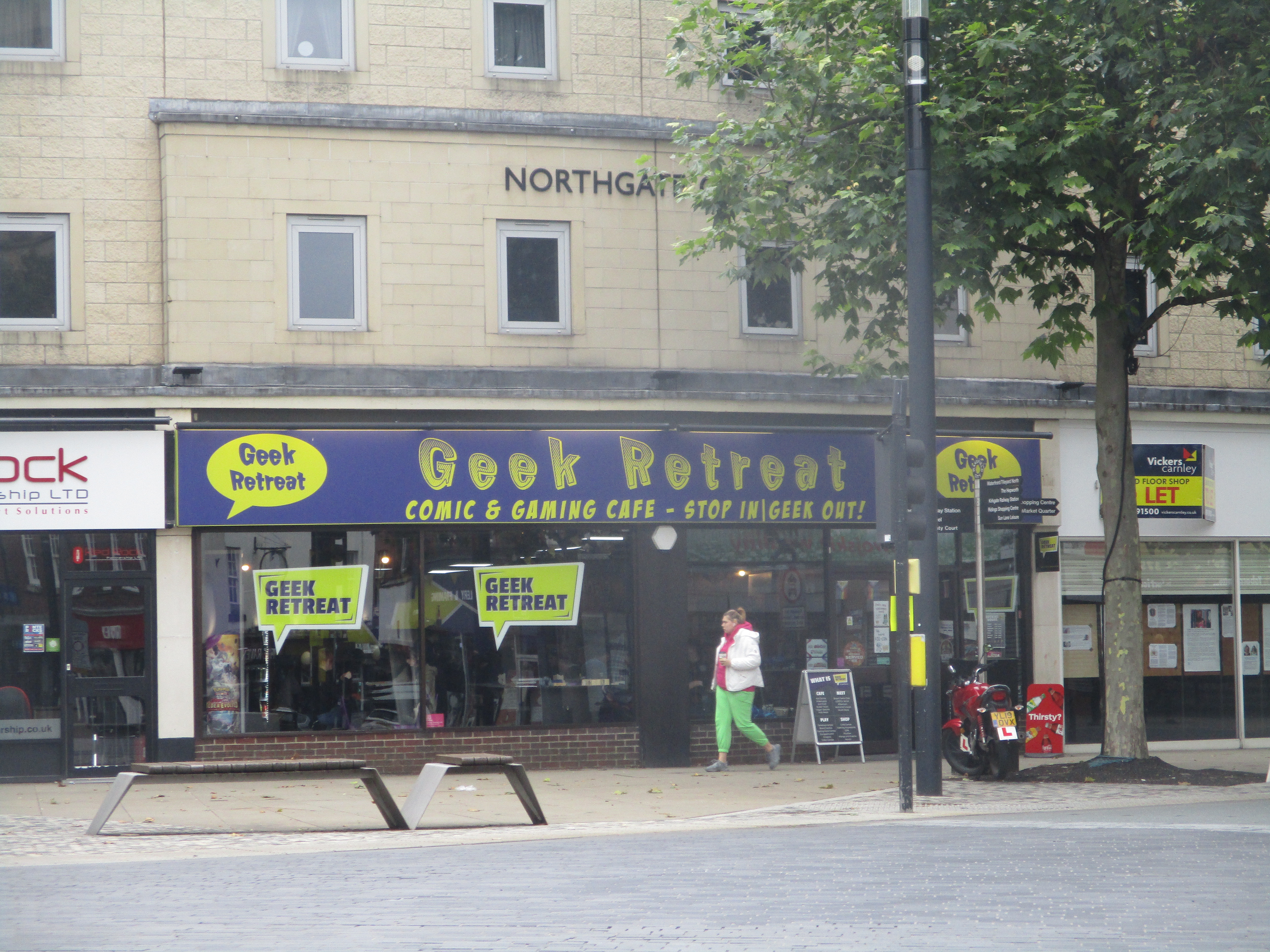
Geek Retreat in Wakefield, West Yorkshire.

The company opened its first venue in Glasgow in 2013 (now closed). Its second venue opened the following year in Newcastle upon Tyne. (also closed) It joined the British Franchise Association in 2021. In June 2021, it had 27 venues, in October 2022 the network had grown to 57. In late 2022, as part of a program of streamlining the corporate entities within Geek Retreat Group, one of the sub companies within the group was put into liquidation.

== Business model ==
Most of the individual venues are franchised. The initial investment for franchisees as of September 2024 is approximately £75,000 and franchisees are expected to pay a monthly franchise fee of 8% gross and a marketing fee of 1%.
