= Radfield Home Care =

English home care provider

- Company type: Private company
- Industry: Home care
- Founded: 2008; 17 years ago
- Founders: Hannah MacKechnie and Alex Green
- Headquarters: Shrewsbury, United Kingdom
- Area served: United Kingdom
- Products: In-home care
- Website: www.radfieldhomecare.co.uk

Radfield Home Care is a British provider of home care in the United Kingdom based in Shrewsbury and founded by Dr Hannah MacKechnie and Alex Green in 2008. It developed from Radfield Residential Home, which operated as a care home business for 26 years. MacKechnie and her family lived and worked in the home.

== History ==
The company was founded in 2008 by Dr Hannah MacKechnie and Alex Green.

It started a franchising operation in 2017 and had opened 12 franchise offices by July 2019. It was the winner of the British Franchise Association’s Emerging Franchisor of the Year 2019. It was also successful in the Top 20 Home Care Provider awards.

The company planned to double its workforce in 2020 with an additional 250 jobs, including some in frontline care, some in recruitment, administration and management roles in local offices around the UK, and some nationwide franchise support jobs at its National Support Centre in Shrewsbury.

By October 2022, there were more than 25 Radfield Home Care offices.
