= Iain Conn =

British businessman (born 1962)

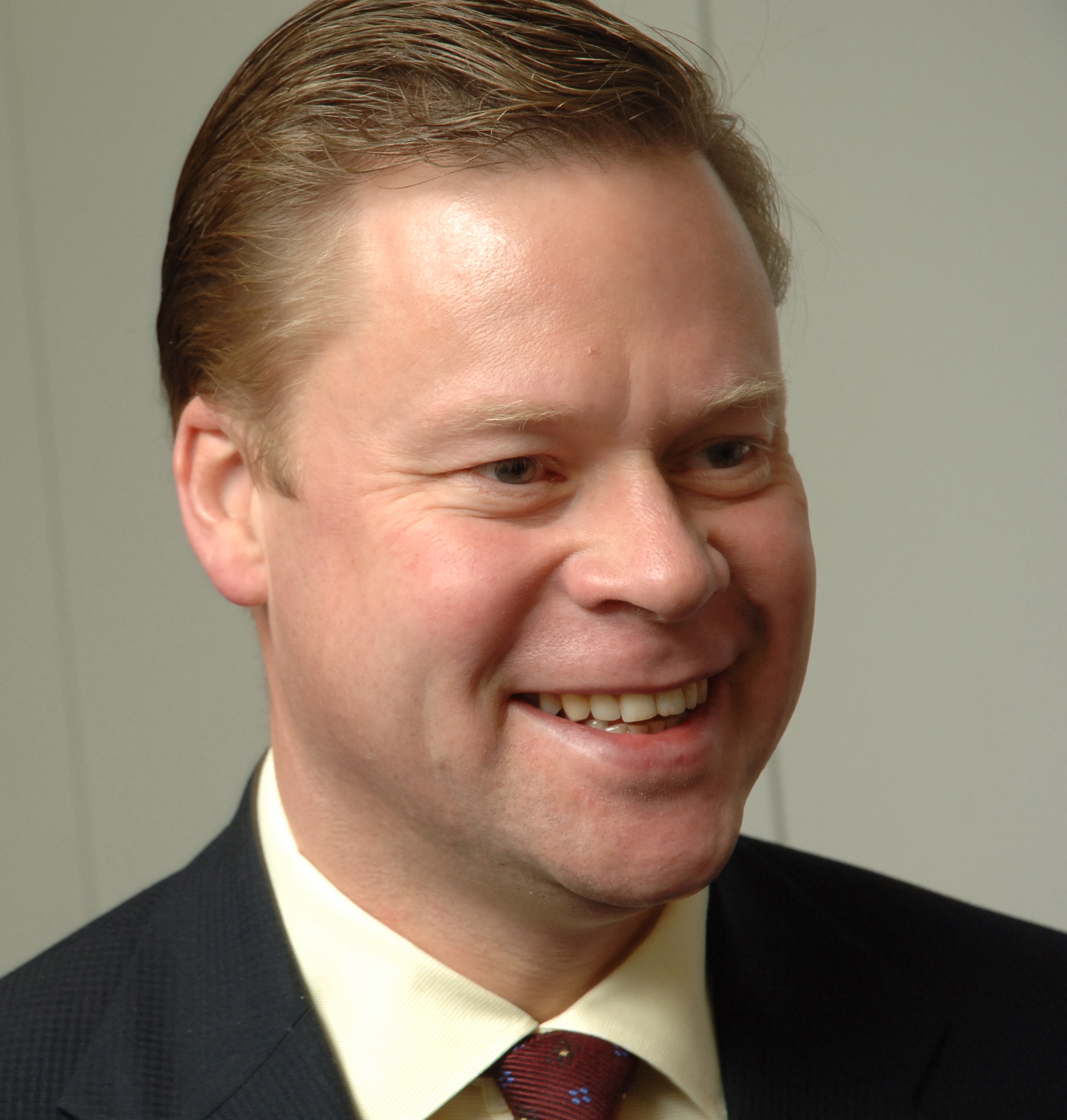
- Iain Conn in 2005
- Born: Iain Cameron Conn; 22 October 1962 (age 63); Edinburgh, Scotland
- Education: St.Marys School, Melrose; Loretto School, Musselburgh
- Alma mater: Imperial College London
- Occupation: Businessman
- Title: Former CEO, Centrica
- Term: 2015-2019
- Spouse: Caroline Conn
- Children: 3

Iain Cameron Conn (born 22 October 1962) is a British businessman. He was the chief executive (CEO) of Centrica from 2015 to 2020.

== Early life ==
Iain Cameron Conn was born in October 1962 in Edinburgh and grew up in Galashiels. The elder of two sons, his father died when Conn was 12. He graduated in 1985 from Imperial College London, where he studied chemical engineering and management.

== Career ==
Conn was chief executive downstream, of BP from 2007 until 2014 and was a main board director from 2004 to 2014. BP's Downstream division comprised all of BP's customer facing, manufacturing and supply businesses in over 70 countries mainly under the BP, Castrol and Aral brands. In addition to leading Downstream, Conn also had group regional responsibility for Europe, Asia and Southern Africa. Previously he was the group executive officer for strategic resources of BP from 2004 to 2007, responsible for most of BP's functions and regional co-ordination, and was chief executive of BP's petrochemical division from 2002 to 2004. Conn spent 29 years at BP, with leadership roles in oil trading, marketing, refining and petrochemicals, and E&P.

From 1 January 2015 until March 2020, Conn was the CEO of Centrica, replacing Sam Laidlaw. In this role Conn had responsibility for Centrica and led the repositioning of the company back towards the customer, reducing costs, shifting the culture, building new capabilities and re-positioning the portfolio for the next phase of the energy transition and in response to the low oil and gas price environment. The company shifted its portfolio emphasis more towards the customer in the areas of energy supply, services, distributed energy and power, and energy marketing and trading. During his tenure he had to contend with the CMA investigation into the UK energy market, and the subsequent introduction of a price cap in retail energy, something Conn opposed because of its effect on competition.

Conn was a director of BP from 2004 to 2014, and Rolls-Royce Holdings from 2005 to 2014, latterly as senior independent director. He was a non-executive director and senior independent director of BT.

Conn was a member of the Council of Imperial College (2010-2019) and chairman of the advisory board of Imperial College Business School (2004-2020) and a member of the advisory board of the Centre for European Reform.

He is currently Senior Advisor to Blackstone and Chairman of EngineeringUK, and has focused his portfolio on the energy transition, technology & engineering and building UK capability. He is a member of the STOP Multiple Sclerosis Appeal Board, and previously was a trustee of the Movement to Work. He was a member of the president's committee of the Confederation of British Industry for many years. Previously he was a member of the advisory boards of the Centre for China in the World Economy at Tsinghua University, and of the Schwarzman School at Tsinghua.

Conn is a fellow of Royal Academy of Engineering, the Royal Society of Edinburgh, the Institution of Chemical Engineers, and the City and Guilds of London Institute.

In July 2019 Centrica announced Conn would be stepping down from his post and retire from the company's board in 2020. Conn told the Today programme it was "a natural time to hand over" following the re-positioning of the company in preparation for the next phase of the energy transition and UK energy market.

Business positions
Preceded by Sam Laidlaw	Chief Executive of Centrica; January 2015 –	Succeeded by Chris O'Shea
Preceded by	Chief Executive BP Downstream; 2007–2014	Succeeded by Tufan Erginbilgic
