= AlertMe =

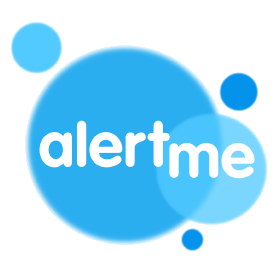
- Type: Subsidiary
- Industry: Home Automation
- Founded: April 2006
- Founder: Adrian Critchlow and Pilgrim Beart
- Defunct: June 2015
- Fate: Acquired by British Gas
- Headquarters: Cambridge, United Kingdom
- Number of employees: Approx. 120 (2015)
- Parent: British Gas Trading Limited (Since 2015)
- Website: www.alertme.com

AlertMe was a British smart tech company that provides home automation and energy monitoring hardware and services. AlertMe produced hardware and software to enable users to monitor and control their home energy use.

In 2015 the company was acquired by British Gas Trading Limited for £65 million. In April 2016 the limited company was renamed to Centrica Connected Home Limited.

AlertMe used Non Intrusive Load Monitoring to extrapolate trends from customer data, which was then used to make energy saving recommendations.

== History ==
AlertMe was founded in Cambridge in 2006 by Adrian Critchlow and Pilgrim Beart as a provider of energy monitoring systems.

By 2009, the company had secured a major trial with British Gas New Energy for its Smart Home platform, leveraging Zigbee-connected hardware like plugs and thermostats to enable remote control and energy analytics.

That same year, they raised £8 million in Series B funding to expand distribution in the UK, Europe, and the US.

AlertMe had strategic partnerships with British Gas in the UK and Lowe's in the United States. British Gas was the largest domestic energy provider in the UK serving 10 million homes and 15.9 million energy accounts. Lowe's was the second largest home improvement retailer in the world with 15 million consumers visiting its 1,725 stores each week.

On 8 June 2015, British Gas acquired control of the AlertMe business in a deal worth approximately £65 million, citing its importance in enabling the Hive Connected Home services.

AlertMe's Honeycomb platform and Zigbee-connected ecosystem became the backbone of Hive Active Heating, British Gas’s smart thermostat and central heating control system. Post-acquisition, the legal entity was renamed Centrica Connected Home Limited in April 2016.

== Products ==
The AlertMe platform was based on a home hub that connected to cloud servers provided by Amazon Web Services via the home broadband router. The hub communicated via Zigbee to devices in the home, both AlertMe devices and third party enabled devices.

The AlertMe platform was open and expandable to allow users to add new devices and applications to their personal dashboard or smartphone app. Core applications included electricity monitoring (SmartEnergy), remote heating control (SmartHeating) and home monitoring (SmartMonitoring), but the platform was designed to be extendable.

== Recognition ==
As of 2009, AlertMe had been recognized for product innovation and business strategy, including:

- Red Herring Europe 100 2012
- Smart Metering UK & Europe Best In Home Display 2012
- Rosenblatt New Energy Award for Best Deal 2011
- IET Innovation Award for Software in Design 2010
- Global Cleantech 100 2009 & 2010
- Bloomberg New Energy Pioneer 2010
- Design Week Consumer Product Design 2009

== See also ==
- Kill A Watt
- OPOWER
