= Bayerngas Norge =

Oil and Gas Company

- Company type: Private
- Industry: Petroleum
- Founded: 2005
- Founder: Bayerngas GmbH and partners
- Defunct: 2017
- Fate: Merged into Spirit Energy
- Headquarters: Oslo, Norway
- Key people: Florian Bieberbach (Chairman of the Board), Arne Westeng (Managing Director)
- Website: www.spirit-energy.com

Bayerngas Norge AS was an oil and gas company with operations in several North-European countries. The company operated upstream with licenses in both Norwegian, Danish and British sectors. The company was established in 2006 and was owned by German, Austrian and Swiss local authorities. In December 2017, Bayerngas Norge was combined with the exploration & production business of Centrica plc to create a new independent oil and gas operator, Spirit Energy.

== Operations ==
At the end of 2013 Bayerngas Norge had 68 licenses: 47 in Norway, 17 in the UK, and 4 in Denmark. Bayerngas Norge had five operatorships in Norway and one in the UK. The company aimed to participate in between five and ten exploration wells per year, preferably in frontier areas. Average daily production was estimated to be around 16,200 barrels of oil equivalent per day (boed) in 2013, which is equivalent to 10 TWh. On August 11, 2013, daily production reached 20,000 boed for the first time.

== Owners ==
There were four shareholders of Bayerngas Norge AS. Bayerngas GmbH owned 19.90% while the company's biggest shareholder was SWM Gasbeteiligungs GmbH with 75.73%. The remaining shares were owned by Swissgas and TIGAS-Erdgas Tirol with 2.50% and 1.87%, respectively. These companies are owned by local authorities in Germany, Austria and Switzerland.

== See also ==
- Oselvar oil field
