= Draughts (board game café) =

Restaurant information
- Established: 2014
- Food type: Craft beers, coffee, snacks
- Dress code: Casual
- Location: 16 Leake Street, London, SE1 7NN, UK
- Reservations: Yes
- Website: www.draughtslondon.com

Draughts is a board game café business based in London, and the first board game café in the city. As of October 2025, the business owns two cafés, one in Stratford and one in Waterloo. The establishment serves craft beers as well as coffee and snacks. A library of board games are available at both venues, and customers may also purchase games from the café.

Its clientele includes board game hobbyists as well as families, young professionals, and couples. Draughts hires staff with hospitality experience to serve drinks and teach people how to play the games.

== History ==
The business was first founded under a railway arch in Haggerston, Hackney by Nick Curci and Toby Hamand in 2014, aiming to stock 500 board games on its premises. The creation of the cafe was funded by bank and government loans, as well as a Kickstarter campaign. It initially charged a flat rate of £5 for a full day, with a reduced fee of £3.50 for members. It followed Thirsty Meeples, the first board game café to open in the UK, and was inspired by the Canadian board game café Snakes and Lattes.

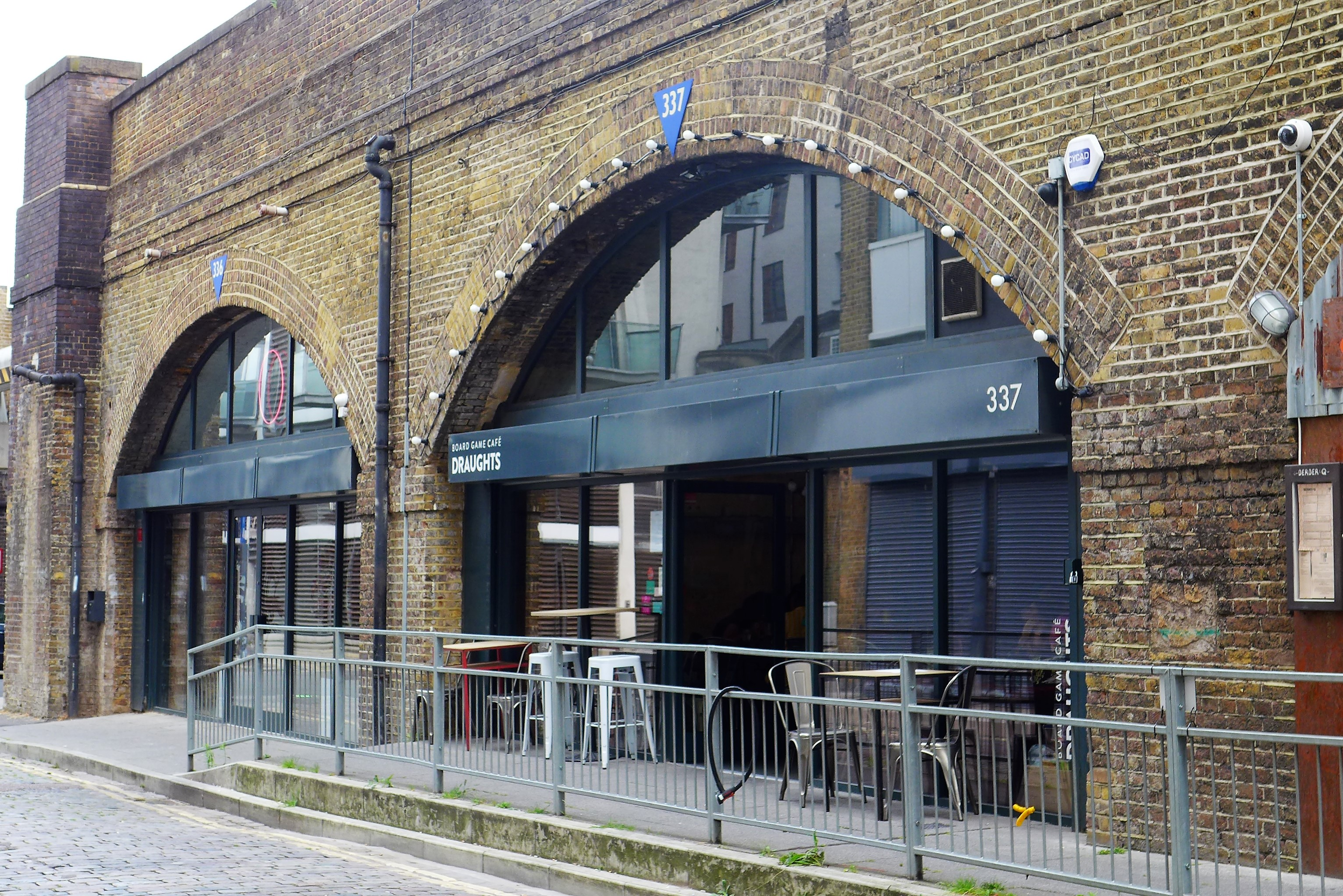
Draughts in Haggerton in August 2019, before moving to Kingsland Road

The Waterloo café opened in 2018, located underneath another railway arch on Leake Street. At this time, the Hackney location was host to over 800 board games.

In October 2019, the Hackney café moved from under a railway arch in Haggerston to a building on Kingsland Road in Dalston, a venue that was twice the size of the previous establishment, able to house 180 guests and over 1,000 games. The entry fee for non-members was changed to allow four hours of gaming, instead of a full day. The Dalston location closed permanently in August 2025.

In 2025, Draughts Stratford opened at 5 Aquatic Walk, London, E20 2AS.

== Popular culture ==
The YouTube channel No Rolls Barred (NRB) was filmed at Kingsland Road on the first floor and sponsored the channel from August 2021 to May 2023.
