= Butendiek Offshore Wind Farm =

Offshore wind farm in Germany

Butendiek
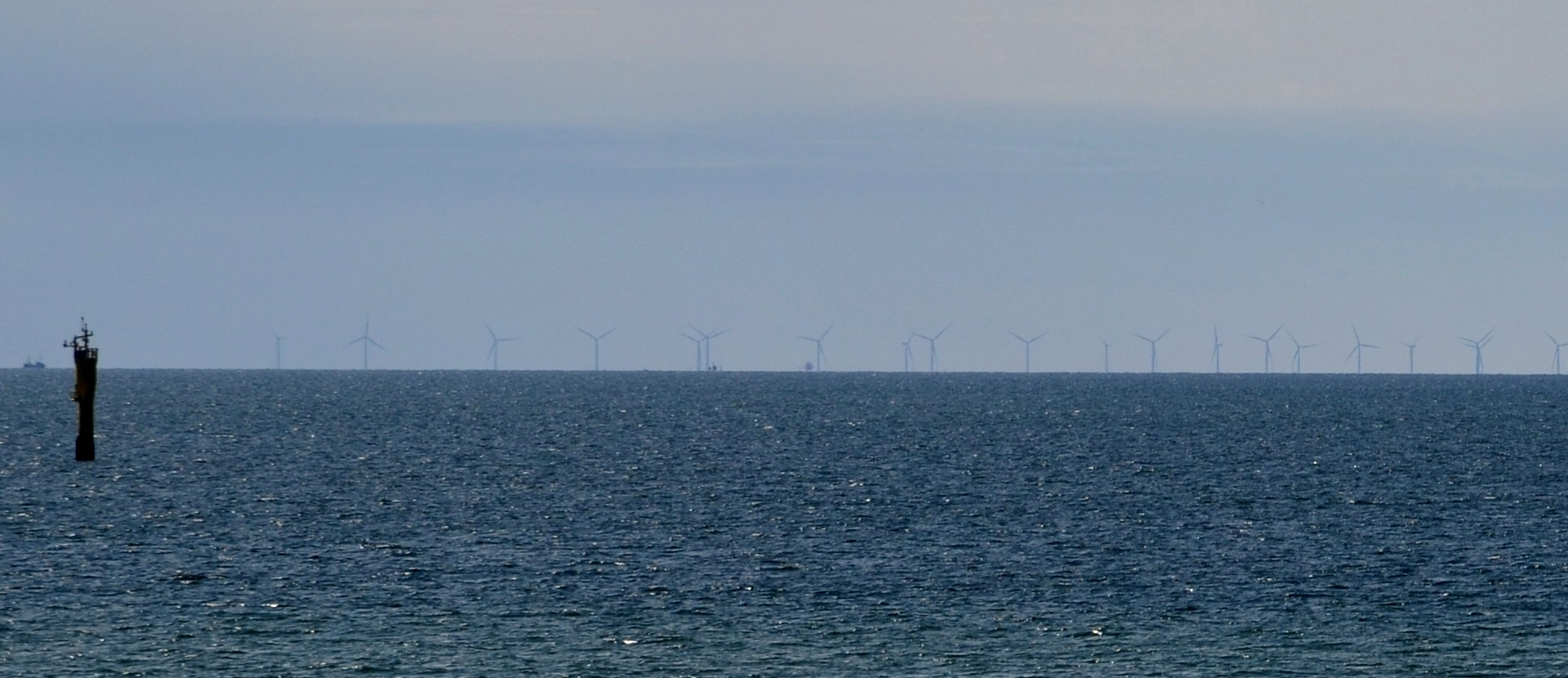
- Country: Germany
- Coordinates: 55°00′49″N 7°46′07″E
- Status: Operational
- Commission date: 2015
- Owners: Skyborn Renewables; Greencoat Renewables

Wind farm
- Type: Offshore
- Max. water depth: 22 m (72 ft)
- Distance from shore: 32 km (20 mi)
- Hub height: 91 m (299 ft)
- Rotor diameter: 120 m (390 ft)
- Site area: 33 km^{2} (13 sq mi)

Power generation
- Units operational: 80 × 3.6 MW
- Make and model: Siemens Gamesa SWT-3.6-120 (80)
- Nameplate capacity: 288 MW

External links
- Website: www.owp-butendiek.de
- Commons: Related media on Commons

Wind farm layout

Buitendiek's location in the wind farms of the German Bight

Butendiek is an offshore wind farm in the German part of the North Sea. It is located 32 km off the island of Sylt, and 53 km from the mainland.

The wind farm consists of 80 Siemens wind turbines with a capacity of 3.6 MW each, giving the farm a total capacity of 288 MW. Construction of the wind farm started in early 2014. The wind farm was completed in 2015.

The SylWin transformer platform connects the power from DanTysk, Butendiek and Sandbank offshore wind farm to shore.

== See also ==
- Wind power in Germany
- List of offshore wind farms in Germany
