= Sam Laidlaw =

British businessman

- Born: William Samuel Hugh Laidlaw; 3 January 1956 (age 70); Kensington, London, England
- Education: Eton College, INSEAD
- Alma mater: Gonville and Caius College, Cambridge
- Occupation: Businessman
- Years active: 1977–present
- Title: Executive Chairman, Neptune Energy
- Term: 2015–present
- Spouse: Deborah "Debbie" Morris-Adams
- Children: 4

William Samuel Hugh Laidlaw (born 3 January 1956, Kensington) is the Executive Chairman of Neptune Energy, the independent E&P company. He is former chief executive officer of Centrica, the British natural gas and electricity company.

== Early life ==
He is the son of Sir Christophor Laidlaw (1922–2010), a manager at BP who went on to be deputy chairman, and was later chairman of computer maker ICL. Sam Laidlaw attended Eton College and studied law at Gonville and Caius College, Cambridge, gaining an MA in 1977. He qualified as a solicitor in 1979 with the Macfarlanes law company. He obtained an MBA in 1981 from the INSEAD Business School in Fontainebleau, France; his father was for a time the chairman of the school's UK advisory body.

== Career ==
Laidlaw was with U.S. oil company Amerada Hess (1981–2001), building its North Sea business before running their worldwide exploration and production business and becoming president and chief operating officer (1995–2001). He was executive vice-president of global business development of the California-based Chevron Corporation from May 2003? and became chief executive officer of Enterprise Oil in 2002? (which was bought under his leadership by Shell in 2002 for £3.5bn). Enterprise Oil also faced a hostile takeover from Eni, the Rome-based oil company.

In January 2008, he was appointed a non-executive director of HSBC Holdings plc, and in December 2010 he was appointed as the lead non-executive director on the board of the Department for Transport. He was also a member of the UK Prime Minister's Business Advisory Group (2010–2012). Until August 2007, he was a non-executive director of [Heidelberg Materials UK[|Hanson plc]]. He is a trustee of the medical charity RAFT.

He has been chairman of the Petroleum Science and Technology Institute, based in Aberdeen, a director of the National Engineering Laboratory and president of the United Kingdom Offshore Operators Association. He chaired a report on business and higher education for the CBI in 2010 and led the inquiry into the failure of the competition for the West Coast Rail Franchise in 2012.

He joined Centrica in July 2006, taking over from Sir Roy Gardner and becoming chairman of the executive committee and the disclosure committee.

In 2015, he founded Neptune Energy, an international oil and gas exploration and production company, and is the firm’s first Executive Chairman.

He has also been a member of the UK Government’s Energy Advisory Panel, President of the UK Offshore Operators Association, a member of the Prime Minister’s Business Advisory Group, the Senior Director for the Department of Transport and a non-executive director of both HSBC Holdings plc and Hanson plc. He is a non-executive director of Rio Tinto plc and Chairman of the National Centre for Universities and Business (NCUB).

== Personal life ==
Laidlaw married Deborah (Debbie) Morris-Adams in Aylesbury Vale, Buckinghamshire in April 1989; they have three sons and a daughter.

Business positions
Preceded by Sir Roy Gardner	Chief Executive of Centrica; July 2006 – December 2014	Succeeded by Iain Conn
Preceded by	Chief Executive of Enterprise Oil; December 2001 – April 2002	Succeeded by Company bought by Shell
