= Domics =

Canadian YouTuber (born 1990)

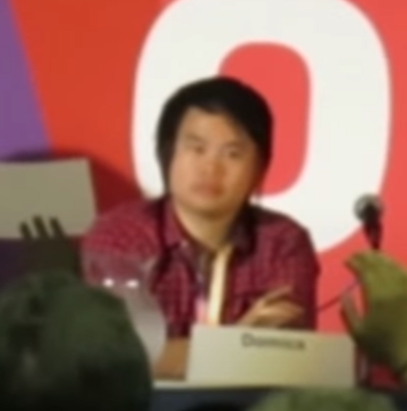
- Panganiban answering questions as a part of the Animators Panel at VidCon 2017
- Born: Dominic Panganiban; 27 September 1990 (age 36); Manila, Philippines
- Education: Toronto Metropolitan University (BSc)

Twitch information
- Channel: D0MICS
- Years active: 2013–present
- Followers: 81 thousand

YouTube information
- Channel: Domics
- Years active: 2012–present
- Genres: Comedy; Animation; Storytelling
- Subscribers: 7.19 million
- Views: 1.24 billion
- Last updated: April 8, 2026
- Website: domics.me

Dominic Panganiban (born 27 September 1990), better known online as Domics, is a Filipino-born Canadian YouTuber, animator, and cartoonist.

Domics generally posts story-time animations in which he tells stories about his life, an aspect of it, or his thoughts. As of February 2025, Domics' YouTube channel has over 7.23 million subscribers and 1.23 billion views. His videos have been featured on multiple websites, including NewNowNext, the Malay Mail Online, and CBS News' website. In November 2014, he joined the multi-channel YouTube network Channel Frederator Network. Prior to doing so, he had been working for a similar YouTube network known as Fullscreen. In July 2015, he told USA Today that compared to Fullscreen, "Frederator was a better fit, because they cater more towards animation channels." Panganiban originally drew online comics, hence his screen name "Domics", a portmanteau of "Dominic" and "comics." He discontinued this to create YouTube videos full-time. In 2018, Domics opened a board game café in Mississauga called "Domics' GG Gaming Café". However, the café was shut down in October 2020. It was located at the Heartland Town Centre. In March 2022, the café reopened at 900 Rathburn Road West in Mississauga.

== Personal life ==
According to one of his videos, he is related to Lani Misalucha, a popular singer in the Philippines. It was also mentioned in the video that he was 65% East/Southeast Asian (with a Japanese great-grandmother from his mother's father's side), and part Polynesian.

== Career ==
In July 2010, Domics started a web comic, to be posted on Tumblr. This would later be called Domics, as his brand. He then created his main YouTube channel in August 2012, shortly after graduating from Toronto Metropolitan University with an architecture degree. By this time, he had accumulated over 100,000 followers on his Tumblr account.

The next day, Domics posted his first YouTube video titled: "Domics: Rural" which set the tone for his channel. On his fourth video, titled "Domics: Relationship Status", he used a vlog format inspired by Swoozie. He would use this style for the majority of his following content. Since creating his YouTube channel, Domics has gained 7.34 million subscribers and 1.2 billion views. His most popular video, "Crushes", (published on September 26, 2016) had 33 million views as of April 2021. He releases about one video every month, most accumulating over a million views. Domics' animations typically consist of him talking about either specific experiences in his life or more general topics. The animations are also usually monochromatic, although in recent years he has used colour in a majority of the animations. In 2022 he explained in a Twitch live now archived on his YouTube channel that he wished to take a break from video making in favor of his mental health. After about a year he started uploading animations again; his schedule has currently slowed down to around a video every three months.
