= DanTysk =

German offshore wind farm in the North Sea

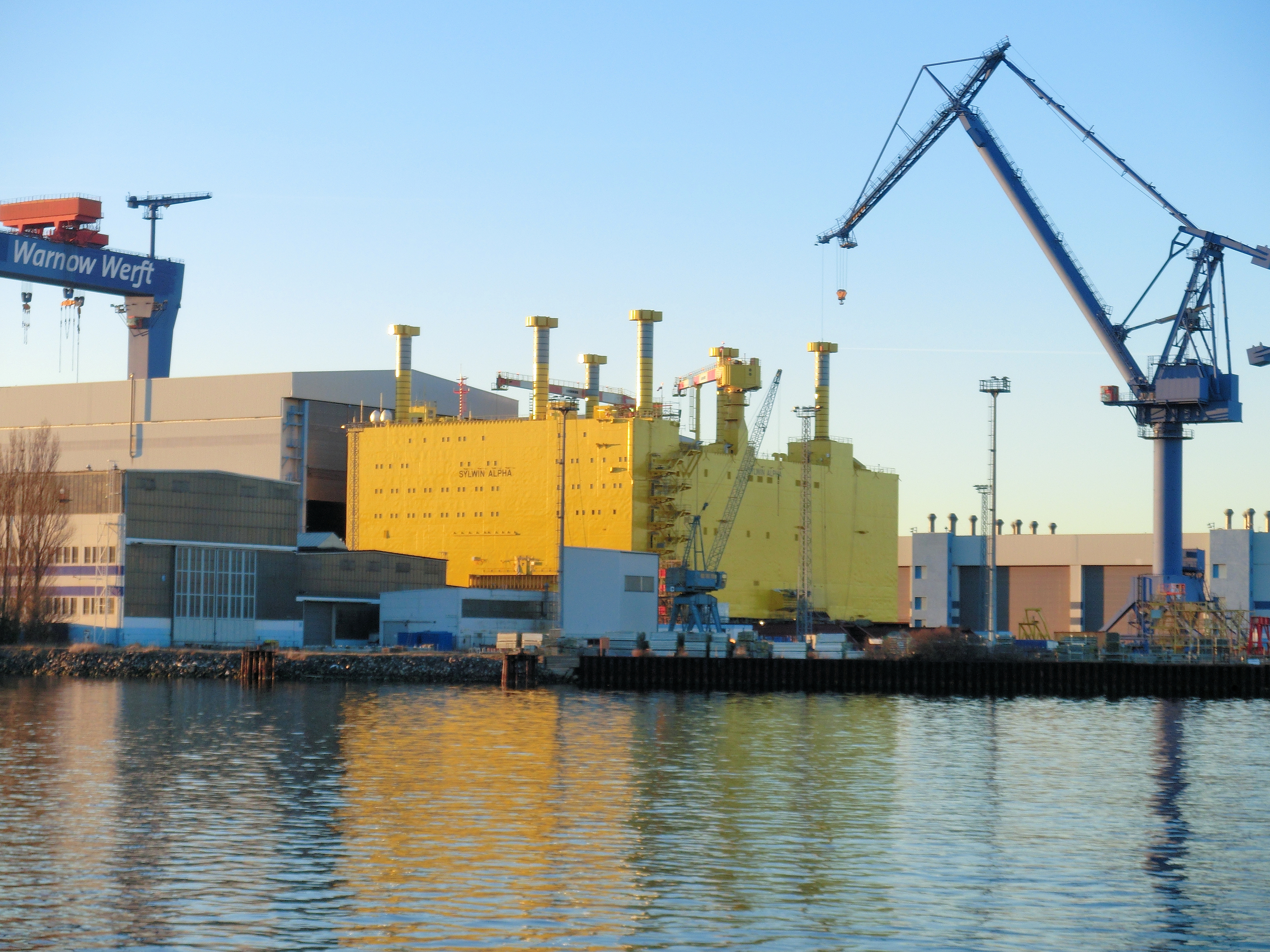
- Country: Germany
- Location: North Sea
- Coordinates: 55°08′N 7°12′E
- Status: Operational
- Commission date: December 2014
- Construction cost: 1000 M€
- Owners: Stadtwerke München; Vattenfall

Wind farm
- Type: Offshore
- Max. water depth: 32 m (105 ft)
- Distance from shore: 70 km (43 mi)
- Hub height: 95 m (312 ft)
- Rotor diameter: 120 m (390 ft)
- Site area: 70 km^{2} (27 sq mi)

Power generation
- Units operational: 80 × 3.6 MW
- Make and model: Siemens Gamesa SWT-3.6-120 (80)
- Nameplate capacity: 288 MW
- Capacity factor: 51.5% (projected)
- Annual net output: 1,300 GW·h (planned)

External links
- Website: www.dantysk.com

Wind farm layout

DanTysk's location in the wind farms of the German Bight

DanTysk is a 288 megawatt (MW) offshore wind farm in the North Sea 70 kilometres (43 mi) west of the island Sylt, in the German EEZ at the border to Denmark. The wind farm operates 80 Siemens Wind Power's SWT-3.6-120 turbines with a capacity of 3.6 MW each.

The project's estimated cost was $900 million. The windfarm is sited in water depths of 21–31 metres (69–102 ft). The turbines were kept warm and healthy with diesel generators for 6 months before onshore cabling was fixed. The farm sent first power to shore in December 2014.

Initially the project was developed by Geo Gesellschaft für Energie und Ökologie. The project was purchased by Vattenfall in 2007. In 2010, Vattenfall sold 49% stake in the project to Stadtwerke München.

The SylWin transformer platform connects the power from DanTysk, Butendiek and Sandbank offshore wind farm to shore. A DKK 375 million accommodation platform for 50 people is being built to service both DanTysk and Sandbank, inspired by Poseidon at Horns Rev 2.

== See also ==
- Wind power in Germany
- List of offshore wind farms
