= Snakes & Lattes =

Coordinates: 43.66482°N 79.41322°W

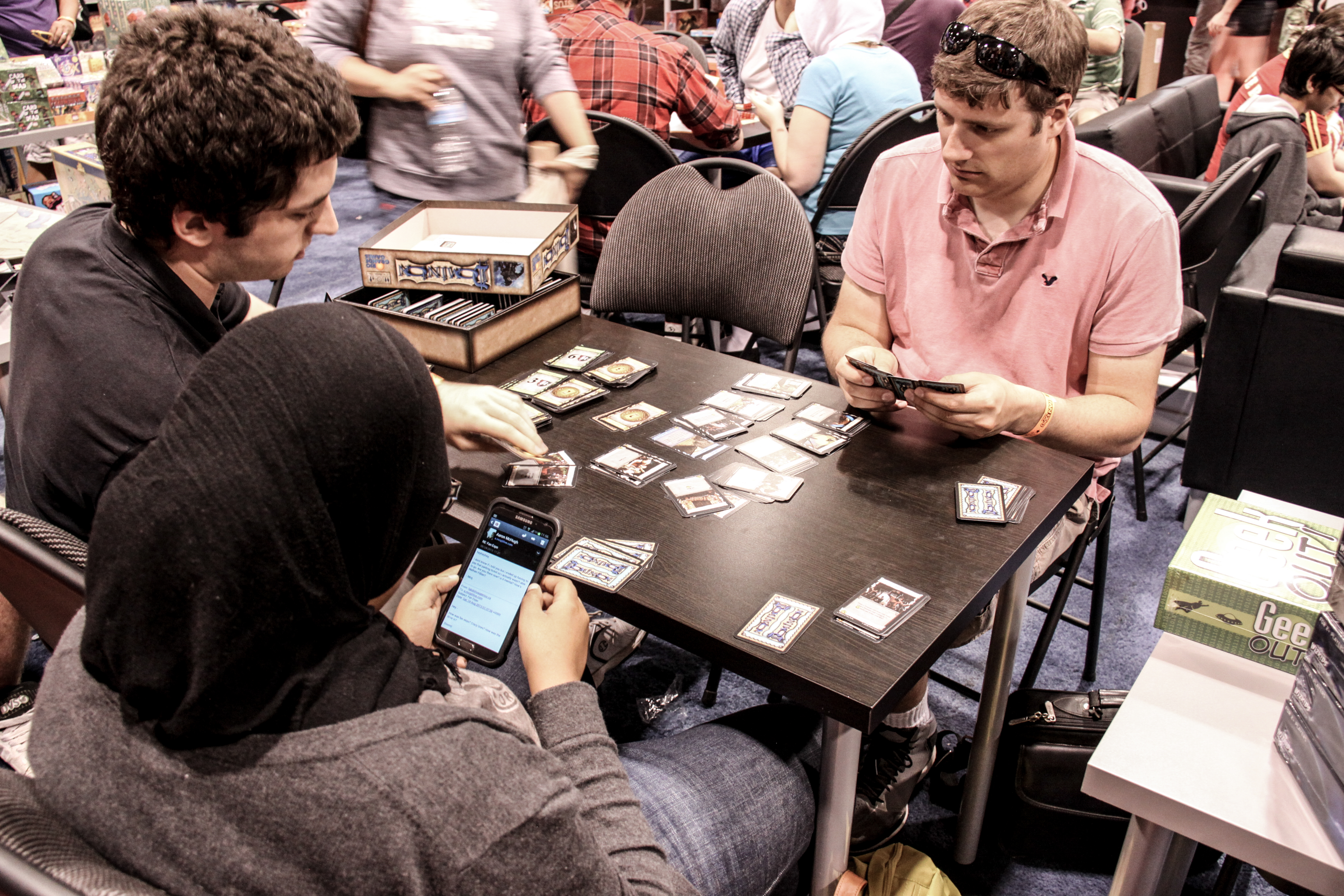
- A game of Dominion at Snakes & Lattes
- Interactive map of Snakes & Lattes

Restaurant information
- Established: 2010
- Owners: Subsidiary of Amfil Technologies, Inc. Publicly traded - ticker symbol: FUNN
- Food type: Coffees, teas, draft beers, sandwiches, snacks, desserts
- Dress code: Casual
- Location: 600 Bloor St. West; 489 College St.; 45 Eglinton Ave. East, Toronto, Ontario, M6G 1K4; M6G 1A5, Canada
- Seating capacity: 150; 240; 250
- Reservations: No
- Website: www.snakesandlattes.com

Snakes & Lattes is a board game café chain headquartered in Toronto, Canada, with two venues in the city and three US venues. The chain is often cited as the main inspiration for other board game cafés in the western world. It is sometimes incorrectly called North America's first board game café, though others predate it.

Guests pay a cover charge to play board and card games for as long as they like, choosing from the café's collection of 1,000 to 3,000 games, depending on location. There was no Wi-Fi available at the original café when it first opened, as the focus was meant to be on playing games and socialising with friends. However, public Wi-Fi was installed in all locations to accommodate those who wished to use their computers, particularly the morning business and student crowd. The cafés serve food and beverage items, including numerous local draft beers.

== History ==
Ben Castanie and Aurelia Peynet opened Snakes & Lattes on August 30, 2010 at what later became known as Snakes & Lattes' Annex location. The couple had moved to Toronto from France four years earlier, and came up with the idea for Snakes & Lattes, which they named after the Snakes and Ladders board game, from a visit to a Chicago area game store in 2008. Over the next two years, they slowly built up their sizable game collection to prepare for the 2010 opening.

As the café gained popularity it quickly outgrew its seating capacity. In 2011, the adjacent property was purchased, and the wall between the two properties was demolished, adding roughly 2,000 square feet to the existing café and increasing capacity from 45 to 150 seats. With 7,500 square feet of space, Snakes & Lattes was, according to its managers, the biggest board game café in the world in January 2016.

In January 2014, a second location was opened, a bar called Snakes & Lagers. Also in 2014, Snakes & Lattes became a sponsor of the Toronto International Film Festival, offering a board game concierge for interested visitors.

In July 2015, The Globe and Mail reported that a sitcom, Snakes & Lattes: The Show, would air starting in September as a fictionalized account of the café's early years.

In September 2015, Snakes & Lagers closed, but immediately reopened in a larger space across the street under the name Snakes & Lattes College in the space that was formerly occupied by the Andy Poolhall bar. The new location features space for 240 guests, a collection of more than 1,000 games, and a combination of the Lattes and Lagers concepts, offering beer, wine, and assorted coffee-based beverages.

In December 2017, Snakes & Lattes opened the corporate flagship location in Midtown at 45 Eglinton Ave East, Toronto. This location covers 10,000 square feet and three floors.

Snakes & Lattes expanded their operation to the United States in 2018. In May 2018, construction began at the first location in the United States in Tempe, Arizona. "Snakes & Lattes Tempe" opened in October 2018, and is located at 20 W. Sixth Street in the popular Mill Avenue District.

Snakes & Lattes is a wholly owned subsidiary of Amfil Technologies, Inc, a publicly traded company using the symbol FUNN. In 2022, it reported a 200% increase in year over year revenue, with over $4 million in gross profits.

== Games ==
The Snakes & Lattes Annex location began in 2010 with approximately 1,200 games, and its collection, under the guidance of a game curator, had grown to about 3,000 games by 2015, all of which are available to the public to be played for as long as desired for a small cover charge. The cafés sell a wide variety of games, at both locations and through an online store. Trained 'game gurus', some with teaching backgrounds, are on hand to help newcomers learn games they are unfamiliar with.

Snakes & Lattes features a monthly Game Designers Night, where game designers offer prototypes to be tested by the public, as well as regularly hosting tutorials and tournaments.

== Roll With It Controversy ==
"Roll With It" was a board game café in Virginia Beach acquired by Snakes and Lattes, that was the location of a controversial mass layoff in February 2024, where Snakes and Lattes corporate management arrived unannounced and laid off the entire staff without warning.

The company then stated that the decision was made to address issues and improve the location, and that advance warning was intentionally withheld to avoid any disruption. The café was then temporarily closed for renovation, however, it never reopened.

== Publishing division ==
In July 2017, Snakes & Lattes announced the formation of its own board game publishing division. One month later, it officially received its first publishing contract, including exclusive distribution rights and a $200,000 signing bonus. Snakes & Lattes retained the services of graphic designer Daniel Bieber in this effort.

On May 29, 2018, Amfil Technologies, Inc. acquired French board game publisher and distributor Morning in an all cash deal worth €150,000. It continued running from France as Snakes & Lattes Publishing SAS. This acquisition gave Snakes & Lattes ownership of five games, including IKAN, Red Panda and Kill the Unicorns.

== Global influence ==
Snakes & Lattes has been cited as the inspiration for the opening of many other board game cafés in the western world, such as Victory Point Café in Berkeley, Draughts in London, Thirsty Meeples in Oxford, the Tabletop Board Game Café in Cleveland, The Uncommons in New York City, Loot & XP in Oklahoma, The Castle, near Boston, Boxcar Board Game Café in Calgary, Chance & Counters in Bristol, Small Print on Prince Edward's Island, and Bonus Round Games in Chicago. This was aided by a 24-part YouTube tutorial created by Snakes & Lattes which described how the business operated in detail. Its business model has thus been replicated by many of these board game cafés.

Snakes & Lattes also pioneered the proliferation of board game cafés in Toronto, which by 2016 had more than 20 such businesses operating across the city.
