= The Uncommons =

Board game cafe

Coordinates: 40.7294°N 73.9987°W

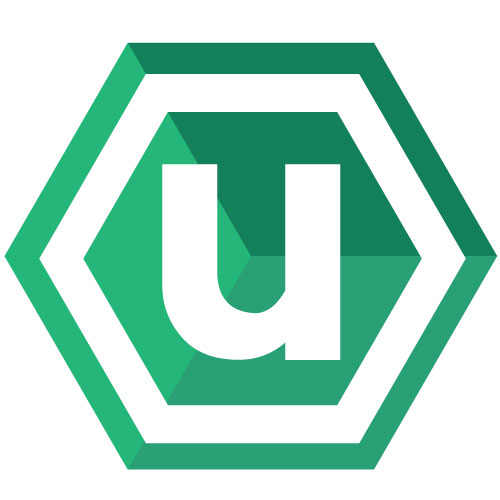
- Type: Private
- Industry: Entertainment/Restaurant
- Founded: August 2013; 13 years ago
- Headquarters: Manhattan, New York, United States
- Key people: Greg May (CEO)
- Website: www.uncommonsnyc.com

The Uncommons is a board game café in New York City established in 2013, located at 230 Thompson Street in Greenwich Village. It has claimed to be the first board game café in Manhattan, and the largest board game library on the East Coast.

Visitors pay a $10 cover charge to access the cafe's lending library of games for 3 hours, and can be served coffee, tea, beer and wine. Despite this, the venues are promoted as a less alcoholic "bar alternative" for New York nightlife.

The cafe caters to high school students, hipsters, elderly people, and tourists. It has previously provided space for Bronies NYC and school chess clubs, and hosts regular events for role-playing games as well as tournaments for Magic: The Gathering.

== History ==
Opened in 2013 by founders Greg May, Jeff Cassin, and Henry Chang, and inspired by Canadian chain Snakes and Lattes, The Uncommons occupied the space of the former Village Chess Shop. It was funded in part by a successful Kickstarter campaign. Upon its opening, visitors could pay $5 per hour to stay and play games as long as they like. In August 2014, the café held more than 475 games.

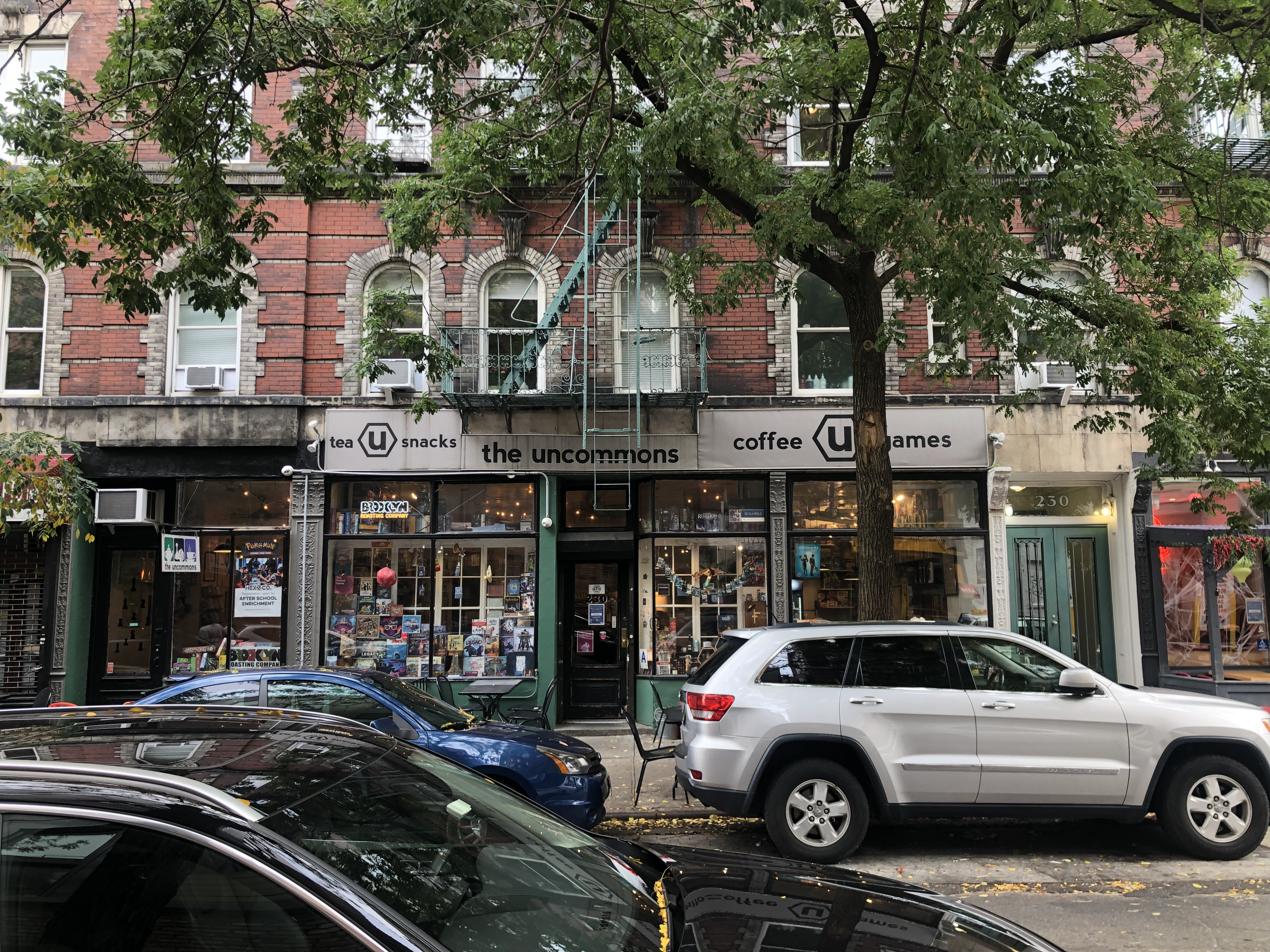
The storefront in October 2021

By September 2022, the cafe's business model had changed to a cover charge of $10 for three hours of access to the venue's alleged library of over 1000 games. However, many of these games were on a "semi-permanent loan" to Hex & Co., another board game café in Manhattan co-owned by Greg May.

In November 2023, workers at The Uncommons unionized, joining Tabletop Workers United within Workers United NY/NJ of SEIU. The Emergency Workplace Organizing Committee provided organizing support.

The Uncommons has been featured on television shows, including NickMom and Take Me to Your Mother.
