= Connaught plc =

Company from UK

- Company type: Public company (LSE: CNT)
- Industry: Outsourcing
- Founded: 1982
- Founder: William Tincknell
- Headquarters: Exeter, UK
- Key people: Sir Roy Gardner (Non-Executive chairman); Ian Carlisle (CEO)
- Revenue: £659.6 million (2009)
- Operating income: £32.6 million(2009)
- Net income: £17.5 million (2009)

Connaught plc was a company in the United Kingdom, operating in the social housing, public sector and compliance markets. A constituent of the FTSE 250 Index, it went into administration in October 2010.

== History ==
The business was founded by William Tincknell (1935–2018) in 1982 as a concrete repair specialist. Four years later, it was awarded its first major social housing concrete repair contract.

=== Expansion ===
During the early 1990s, Connaught expanded its services to include external wall insulation and overcladding and latterly began refurbishing all external elements of social housing including roofs, windows and doors. The business also expanded geographically. The 1990s saw significant corporate changes at Connaught plc, first in 1996 via a management buyout funded by HSBC Private Equity and again in 1998 when the business was floated on the Alternative Investment Market. Mark Tincknell headed the business as CEO throughout this period. By 2004, the business had acquired social housing service providers in Scotland and Wales and had revenues in the region of £300 million and negligible net debt. During 2005, Mark Davies was appointed CEO. In 2006, Stephen Hill, formerly at Serco, was appointed finance director. During 2006, Connaught was fully listed on the London Stock Exchange and, by 2007, the company had become a constituent of the FTSE 250 Index.

Having acquired Gasforce in 2002, Connaught appointed Altium Capital to advise on its regulatory obligations and acquisition strategy from 2003. Between 2005 and 2007, Connaught acquired seven other related businesses and became the UK's leading provider of integrated compliance services with the 2007 acquisition of National Britannia. The acquisition of National Britannia cost the company £91 million, which was part funded by £57.9 million raised from investors. During 2009, Connaught acquired the listed environmental services company Fountains plc in exchange for £13 million.

=== Collapse ===
Connaught was shaken by a series of events triggered by the abrupt departure of its CEO Mark Davies in January 2010 following the sale of his shares valued at £5.5m. After Connaught issued a positive statement, shareholders were surprised when the business issued a profit warning on 26 June 2010; the company explained that the emergency budget introduced by the new government had damaged the company's profitability. Connaught subsequently warned of a 'material loss' for the year ended 31 August 2010.

On 8 July 2010, Mark Tincknell, who had taken over the running of the business again when Davies departed, resigned from the CEO's position, after which point Ian Carlisle took over the post. During May 2010, Sir Roy Gardner was appointed chairman to Connaught's Board.

On 8 September 2010, Connaught plc and Connaught Partnerships, the company's social housing arm, were put into administration. That same month, Morgan Sindall purchased the repairs division of Connaught plc, saving 2,500 jobs in the process. During February 2011, Rentokil Initial acquired the Fumigation & Pest Control, Water Treatment & Hygiene and Fire Safety & Prevention businesses of Santia, formerly Connaught plc, for £5.6m.

== Regulatory investigation ==
The preparation, approval and audit of the financial statements leading up to the administration of Connaught plc were investigated by the Accounting and Actuarial Disciplinary Board.

== Operations ==
The Group was organised into three divisions:

- Connaught Partnerships
- Connaught Compliance
- Connaught Environmental
