= Dyno (company) =

British emergency drainage and plumbing company

Dyno-Rod
- Company type: Limited company (subsidiary of British Gas)
- Industry: Drains, Plumbing
- Founded: 1963
- Headquarters: Millstream, Maidenhead Road, Windsor, Berkshire
- Key people: Matthew Hockaday Director
- Parent: Centrica
- Website: www.dyno.com

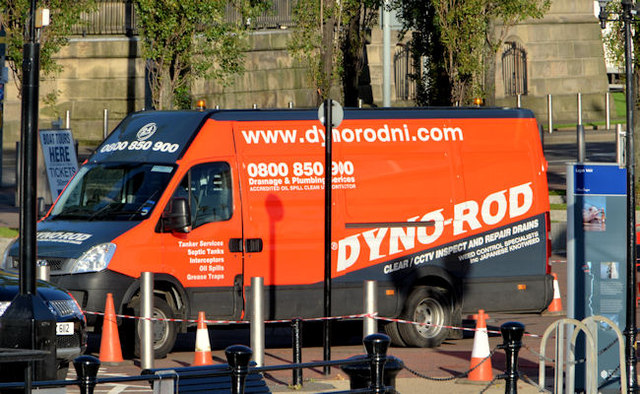
An orange Dyno-Rod van in Belfast

Dyno-Rod is an emergency drainage and plumbing company operating in the United Kingdom. Formed in 1963 as Dyno-Rod, Dyno initially specialised in the use of electromechanical machines for drain clearance. Since then, the company has grown considerably, consolidating its drainage business and diversifying into comprehensive plumbing services, for both domestic and industrial sites. It is a franchise granting limited company.

Dyno-Rod describes itself as "one of the market leaders in our field." Apart from clearing blockages, it uses CCTV to inspect drains, makes plumbing repairs, and installs new pipework. The company offers a twenty four hour emergency response service across the United Kingdom and Ireland (Éire).

Dyno-Rod was acquired by Centrica's subsidiary British Gas for £57.6 million ($104.3m) in October 2004.

== History ==
Dyno-Rod service was launched in 1963 by Jim Zockoll, in South London, and the business was based in Surbiton for many years. Zockoll was a flight engineer for Pan American, who spotted an opportunity whilst on a stopover in London: the hotel where he was staying was suffering drainage problems, had outdated repair equipment, and was taking too long on repairs. Zockoll flew back to the US to get his electro-mechanical drain-cleaning machine – equipment which was unknown in the UK – and cleared it in 20 minutes, giving birth to the company Dyno-Rod.

Dyno-Rod based its drain cleaning service on what were then new electromechanical techniques. After initial success, Dyno began granting franchise licences in 1965. There are currently twenty five Dyno franchisees in the United Kingdom. As the first non fast food franchised business in the United Kingdom, and the second franchised business of any kind there, Dyno-Rod played a prominent role in the formation of the British Franchise Association, of which it remains a full member.

Over time, the Dyno brand developed other associated businesses. Dyno-Secure was launched in 1987, to offer a range of locks and security services, while in 2001, Dyno-Plumbing offered a comprehensive plumbing service. Dyno Group was acquired by British Gas, a subsidiary of Centrica, in October 2004. Since then, Dyno franchisees have developed larger territories and operate multiple brands within the Dyno group.

== In popular culture ==
The then Prime Minister, David Cameron, compared himself in April 2014 to the company's services, saying "If there are things that are stopping you from doing more, think of me as a giant Dyno-Rod".
