= Hive Connected Home =

British provider of smart home devices

Hive
- Website type: Subsidiary
- Founded: 2012
- Headquarters: London, United Kingdom
- Industry: Home automation
- Products: Hive Active Heating; Hive Active Light; Hive Sensors; Hive Active Plug; Hive app Hive EV charger
- Employees: 200+ (2015)
- Parent: Centrica (2012-present)
- Website: www.hivehome.com
- Native clients on: iOS, Android (Google Play and Amazon Appstore), Windows 10 Mobile

Hive is an eco-tech company owned by Centrica that produces smart home devices and is on a "mission to transform home energy and build a greener, fairer, future for all". It is one of the largest connected home providers in the UK and, as of April 2025, the company had more than 2,000,000 customers.

Using the Hive app and website, customers can control a range of internet-connected devices, from a thermostat to lights, smart plugs, motion sensors, and window and door sensors.

As well as smart home tech, Hive now offer a range of eco-tech products to reduce customer's energy usage - including solar panels & batteries, heat pumps and electric car chargers.

== History ==
Before the creation of the Hive brand, British Gas had been trialling a remote control heating service, starting in September 2011, using technology from AlertMe. This led to the launch of the Remote Heating Control service in 2012 paving the way for the later Hive-branded smart heating system.

Hive was established when parent company Centrica, owner of British Gas, formed its Connected Homes sector in 2012. The year after it was founded, the company launched Hive Active Heating on October 14, 2013, a smart thermostat that allows customers to control heating and hot water in their homes via the company's website or app. The system can be installed in customers' homes by a British Gas engineer.

In February 2015, British Gas purchased the connected home firm AlertMe in a deal worth £65 million. This allowed Hive to build its devices using the Honeycomb platform developed by AlertMe, which facilitates the capability for users to control all their smart home devices through an app. This meant Hive could more closely compete with similar platforms used by rivals such as HomeKit, Project Brillo and Nest Labs.

Hive Active Heating 2, the second edition of the company's smart heating system, was released in July 2015. The new model was upgraded to include two additional features. The holiday mode setting allows customers to set a given temperature while away from home. The boost function allows customers to immediately turn heating and hot water on for a period of up to six hours.

The smart thermostat was designed by Silicon Valley–based, Swiss designer Yves Béhar, who won Design Miami Design Visionary Award in 2015. It was praised for its sleek look, with critics saying it was an improvement on the company's first active heating model, which was criticised for having a dull aesthetic. However, in the same year, complaints about the lack of data security led to changes in the software. The company improved data encryption as a result of an investigation by Which? magazine.

The company also paired up with Dulux to provide accessory frames for the thermostat in a range of different colours.

In 2015 the company announced future plans to use the Honeycomb platform to support and allow integration with third-party products including a Samsung camera.

The company launched two new products in January, 2016. The Active Plug enables users to attach devices, monitor whether they are on or off, remotely-controlling them using a mobile device or laptop. The Window or Door Sensor allows customers to remotely monitor when windows or doors in their home are opened or closed.

The company released the Motion Sensor on February 9, 2016. Customers can use it to keep track of movement within their homes remotely.

On June 13, 2016, the company launched the Active Light, supplied by the Aurora Group, which users can control remotely to turn the bulb on and off and program lighting schedules.

On August 11, 2016, the company announced a partnership with IFTTT (If This, Then That) to allow the smart thermostat to connect to 300 additional products and services through expanded recipe-based automation.

In September 2016, Hive announced it will partner with Amazon Echo, allowing customers to use Alexa voice control to activate lighting, plugs and heating.

On September 27, 2016, the company launched two new smart LED bulbs that can be controlled to alter the colour and tone of the bulbs.

Effective December 31, 2019, Centrica Hive Limited discontinued the direct sale of products and related services for Hive in the United States and Canada.

On July 11, 2022, Hive announced they would no longer sell their security and leak range of products including Hive View cameras, Hive HomeShield and Hive Leak devices. These products are scheduled to be remotely disabled between December 2022 and August 2025.

== Marketplace ==
Energy efficiency targets set by UK energy industry regulator Ofgem aim to convert 53 million homes and small businesses to use smart gas and electricity meters by the end of 2020. Since this was announced, there has been an increase in partnerships between smart thermostat companies and utility companies.

== Operations ==
The company is the only UK-based, connected homes organisation that provides an end-to-end service, including the creation and installation of devices while also providing customer support on an ongoing basis.

Beginning with 15 staff members, by 2015 this had grown to 200. The company offers services in the UK, the Republic of Ireland and North America.

=== Devices ===
The main devices offered include a smart thermostat, lightbulbs, motion sensors for doors and windows, and what the company refers to as a smart plug - all of which operate on an interconnected system that links to a central hub connected to the internet.

Devices can be controlled via the hub, either by using the company website or smartphone app (available on iOS and Android). Users can turn devices on and off both remotely and manually.

== Criticism and controversy ==
In August 2015, a Which? investigation claimed that the Hive app was a "burglars dream" because it was sending data that was unencrypted, including heating schedules and away settings, posing a security risk to customers should their Wi-Fi be tapped into. The company was informed about the Which? investigation in May 2015 and immediately began encrypting previously vulnerable data.

There was criticism of Hive because users could only operate devices designed for the company's system, instead of integrating multiple platforms like companies such as nCube do. However, in August 2016 it was announced the partnership with IFTTT will allow for cross-platform collaboration.

Hive faced consumer backlash when in July 2022 they announced their security and leak line of products were being discontinued and remotely disabled. Consumers had minimal options for refunds and left many with devices which were working perfectly fine but have since been remotely disabled by Hive.

== Awards ==
Year	Awarding body	Type of award	Result
2014	UK Customer Experience Awards	Technology and Telecoms	Won
2014	UK Customer Experience Awards	New Product / Product Improvement	Won
2014	Appsters	Champion	Won
2014	Appsters	Best IoT Development	Won
2014	Appsters	Best App Technology	Won
2014	The Appys	Best Desktop / Web App	Won
2014	Ignite Award	Internet of Things	Won
2014	Starpack	Best Retail Launch Packaging	Won
2017	The T3 Awards	Best Connected Eco/Energy Product	Won
2018	The Ambient Smart Home Awards	Home security tech of the year	Shortlisted
2018	The Ambient Smart Home Awards	Smart home design of the year	Shortlisted
2018	The Ambient Smart Home Awards	Smart energy product of the year	Shortlisted
