= Craft café =

Café that operates craft activities with traditional café service

A craft café, also known as a DIY café or creative café, is a type of café that combines traditional food and beverage service with handicraft activities (such as pottery painting, knitting, embroidery, canvas painting, or other artistic activities) that customers can engage in.

Craft cafés usually serve as third places where customers can socialize while creating handmade items in a provided space. The concept emerged in the United States during the 1990s with paint-your-own pottery studios and has since evolved to cover a wider variety of crafts.

== History ==
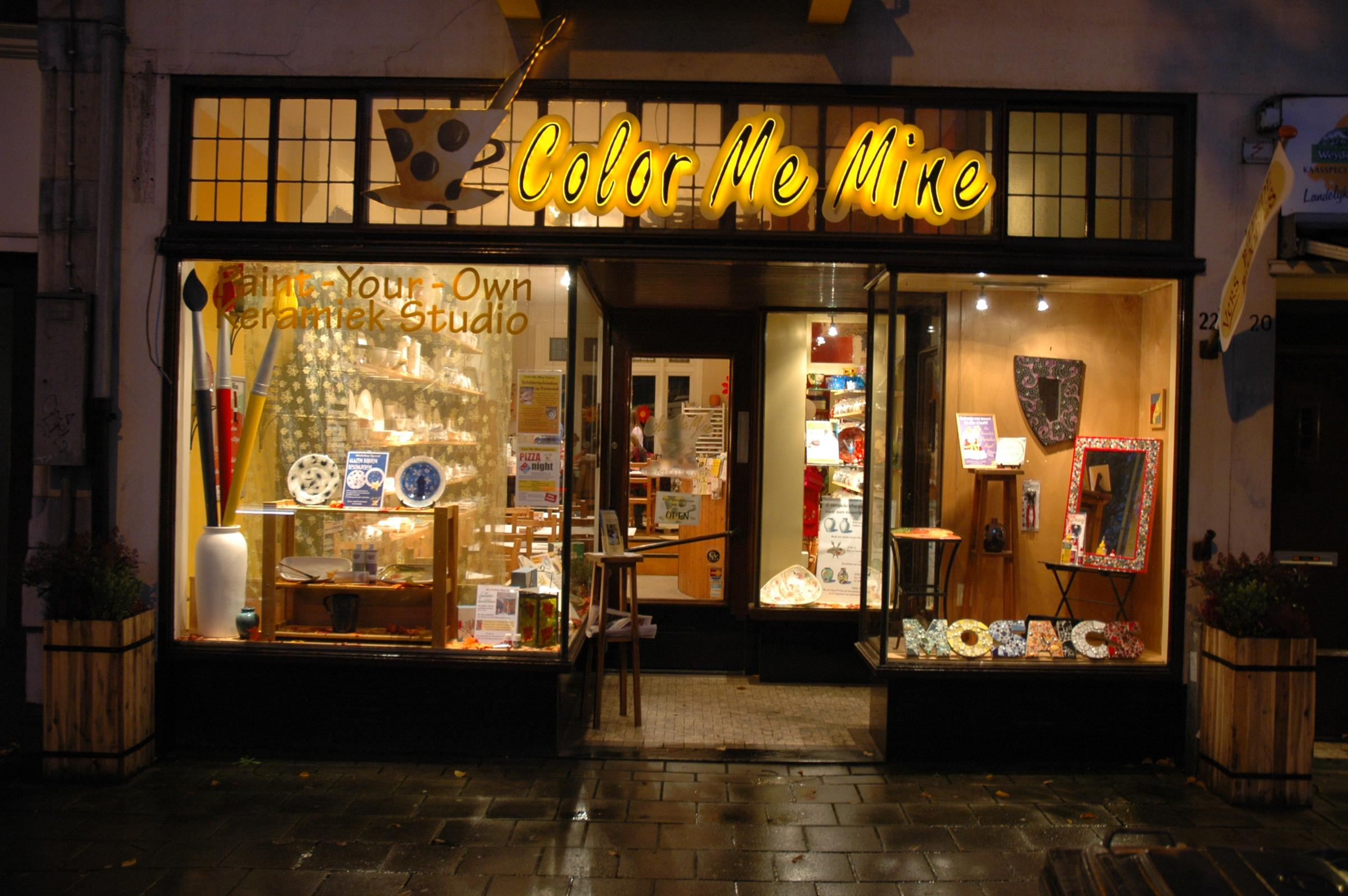
Color me Mine - paint-your-own pottery studio

=== Origins in paint-your-own pottery ===
The modern craft café concept has its roots in the paint-your-own pottery movement that began in the United States during the early 1990s. Color Me Mine, founded in California in 1991, is credited as the originator of the paint-it-yourself ceramics concept. The concept expanded quickly as more independent studios opened up across the United States in the 1990s.

By 1998, a case study showed that there were more than seventy paint-your-own pottery shops operating in the United States. The concept was particularly established on the West Coast before expanding to New England and other regions.

Pottery painting cafés emerged in the United Kingdom during the late 1990s. In 1998, The Pottery Café in Fulham, London, opened in collaboration with British ceramicist Emma Bridgewater, introducing pottery painting that uses UK-made ceramics.

=== Expansion to diverse crafts ===
In 2000s, the concept of craft café expand beyond pottery to include other crafts. Knitting cafés emerged in many countries, with notable examples including Banul near Ewha Womans University in Seoul, South Korea, which combined a knitting school, shop, and café in a single complex. Similar establishments appeared in Paris with L'Oisivethé, Paris's first café tricot (knitting café), and in São Paulo with Novelaria Knit Café in Vila Madalena.

The trend gained interest throughout the 2010s and 2020s, particularly among younger generations who were drawn to the analog and mindful activities trend. The COVID-19 pandemic pushed crafting interest even higher as lockdowns drove people to find activities they could do at home. By the mid-2020s, traditional crafts experienced a notable resurgence among Generation Z, who embraced activities such as pottery, knitting, needlework, and woodworking as forms of mindfulness and community connection.

In the Netherlands, Artsy Avenue opened in Groningen as the country's first ceramic painting café before expanding to Amsterdam on the Nassaukade in 2024.

== Concept and operations ==
=== Business model ===
Craft cafés typically operate on a hybrid business model, generating revenue from both food and beverage sales and craft activities. Most establishments charge customers either an hourly studio fee plus the cost of materials, or a flat workshop rate that includes materials and refreshments.

Paint-your-own pottery studios typically charge a studio fee (often $7.50-$10 per person) plus the cost of the ceramic piece selected, which can range from $5 to $75 depending on size and complexity. After customers complete their painting, staff members will glaze and fire the pieces in on-site kilns. Finished items would be ready for collection within approximately one week.

=== Design and atmosphere ===
Craft cafés are designed to balance the comfort of a traditional coffeehouse with the functionality of a creative studio. Spaces typically feature work tables, craft supplies, and displays of finished customer work or local artisan products.

Staff are usually available to provide crafting guidance to customers, and some venues host structured workshops and classes led by local artists and instructors. Many places run regular events such as evening workshops, private parties, and community gatherings, serving as third places for people to socialize and connect.

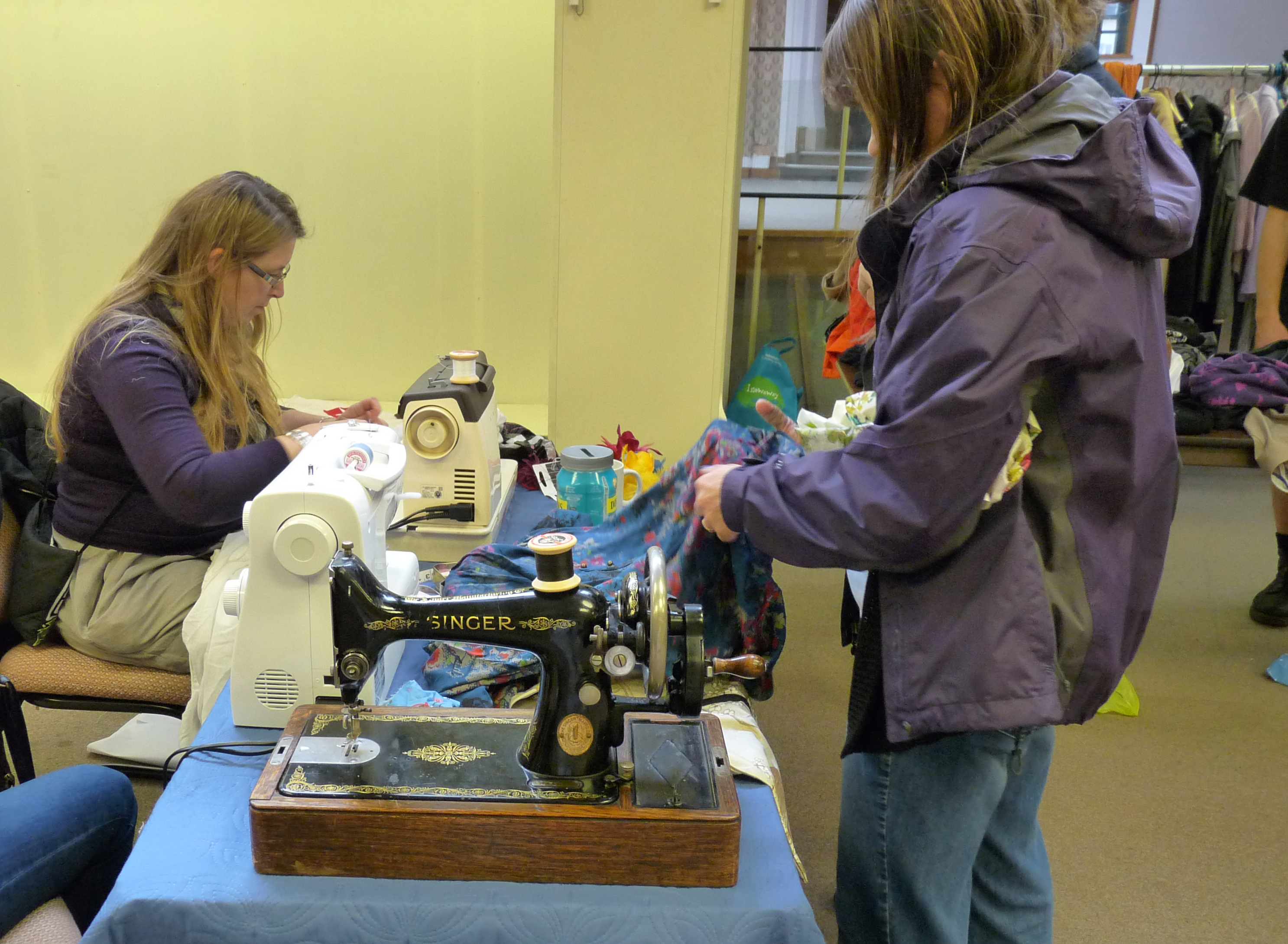
Textiles and Sewing Repairs

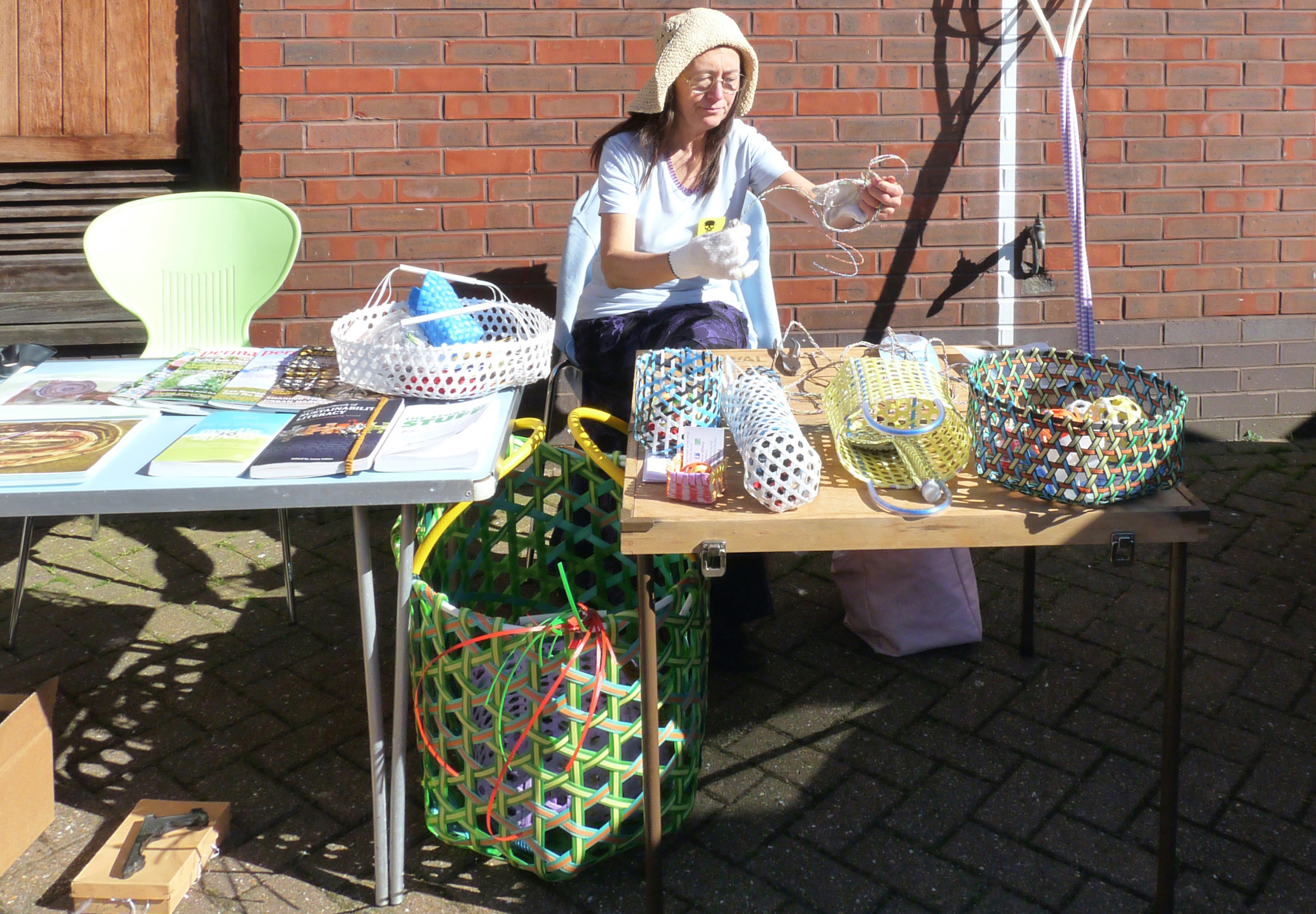
Upcycling Workshop

=== Activities offered ===
Common activities at craft cafés include:

- Pottery painting and ceramics
- Knitting and crochet
- Embroidery and needlework
- Canvas painting
- Candle-making
- Resin crafts and jewelry
- Upcycling
- Woodworking and pyrography
- Glass fusing
- Calligraphy and lettering

Some cafés specialize in a single type of craft, while others provide multiple activity stations that allow customers to explore different crafts.

== Cultural significance ==
=== Social and therapeutic aspects ===
Craft cafés have been recognized for their role in delivering therapeutic and mindful activities, which are particularly appealing to younger generations seeking alternatives to screen time. This phenomenon is part of a larger trend in which Millennials and Generation Z are adopting traditional crafts as ways to express themselves creatively and relieve stress. Craft cafés provide affordable, screen-free activities as alternatives to expensive nights out, bringing many young people who were feeling isolated during pandemic lockdowns a sense of community and real-world connection.

Research has demonstrated significant mental health benefits associated with crafting activities. A 2024 study by Anglia Ruskin University of more than 7,000 UK adults found that arts and crafts produced greater life satisfaction than paid employment, with participants reporting higher levels of happiness and a stronger sense that life is worthwhile. Professor Daisy Fancourt from University College London has noted that Generation Z demonstrates a proactive focus on mental health and recognizes the value of creative hobbies in regulating biological stress levels.

Crafting activities are described to promote meditative, repetitive hand motions that can help control breathing and manage anxiety. The concept of craft cafés functioning as third places offers people a way to connect and participate in creative projects outside of their home or office, a dynamic which helps combat loneliness and fosters social connection. Since the pandemic, younger individuals have increasingly visited venues like Fulham's Pottery Café, with staff members describing the experience as therapeutic.

=== Economic impact ===
The craft café industry has contributed to the broader craft economy, which has grown as younger generations have turned hobbies into entrepreneurial ventures. Approximately 20% of the British population engage in arts and crafts, with the industry contributing approximately £3.4 billion to the UK economy. The global arts and crafts market has been forecast to be worth $50.91 billion worldwide. The emergence of e-commerce platforms and social media has enabled craft café customers to showcase their finished work, and, in some cases, develop small businesses using the skills they learned at these venues.

== By region ==
=== North America ===
In the United States, craft cafés range from small independent studios to franchise operations like Color Me Mine, which operates nearly 140 locations worldwide. In Seattle, Stitch Cafe, opened on Capitol Hill in 2024, combines coffee from Upright Tree Coffee Roasters with a space where customers can work on fiber arts like knitting and crochet.

=== Europe ===
In the United Kingdom, craft cafés have spread throughout cities including London, Manchester, and Brighton. The activities offered are beyond traditional pottery painting. The Pottery Café in Fulham, London, which opened in 1998 and seats approximately 50 painters, has experienced a significant increase in younger visitors since the COVID-19 pandemic, with sessions starting at £7.95 per person plus the cost of pottery pieces ranging from £6 to £60.

UK craft cafés commonly offer workshops in activities including candle-making, embroidery, punch needle, resin art, macramé, lino printing, terrarium-making, and various textile crafts.

In the Netherlands, Artsy Avenue opened in Groningen as the country's first ceramic painting café before expanding to Amsterdam on the Nassaukade in 2024.

=== Asia ===
In Japan, craft workshops with café elements have become viral in Japanese cities like Tokyo. These spots typically feature traditional crafts like pottery-making with tea service, where customers make their own pieces while enjoying drinks and snacks.

In South Korea, pottery and craft cafés have gained popularity in Seoul, particularly in neighborhoods of Hongdae and Gangnam. Places like Ceradu Ceramics Studio offers different pottery experiences with wheel throwing, hand painting, and ceramic cup painting, along with spaces to check out and purchase handmade pieces. Craft cafés throughout Seoul also host workshops in ceramics, painting, perfume-making, and more types of activities. Knitting cafés such as Banul also merge knitting schools, yarn shops, and café services into one place.

In Thailand, Bangkok has developed craft cafés that offer activities encompassing candle-making, soap crafting, perfume blending, canvas painting, and terrarium-making workshops.

== See also ==
- Cat café
- Internet café
- Manga café
- Board game café
- Third place
- Arts and Crafts movement
- Maker culture
