= Chris O'Shea =

Scottish businessman

- Born: Christopher Michael O'Shea; 23 October 1973 (age 52); Kirkcaldy, Scotland
- Education: St Paul's RC Primary School, Glenrothes; Holy Cross High School, Hamilton
- Alma mater: University of Glasgow; Duke University
- Occupation: Businessman
- Title: CEO, Centrica
- Term: 2020-
- Predecessor: Iain Conn
- Board member of: Centrica, ITT
- Children: 3

Chris O'Shea (born 23 October 1973) is a Scottish businessman. He has been the chief executive (CEO) of Centrica since early 2020. He has been a non-executive director of ITT since May 2024.

== Early life ==
O'Shea is Scottish and was born in Fife in 1973. His family moved to Glasgow when he was 11. He studied Accounting & Finance at the University of Glasgow, and completed an MBA at Duke University.

== Career ==
O'Shea was chief financial officer of Vesuvius plc until September 2015, when he was appointed finance director of Smiths Group.

=== Centrica ===
O'Shea joined Centrica in 2018 as chief financial officer before becoming chief executive officer in early 2020.

O'Shea has led a turnaround of Centrica, cutting 5000 jobs of which more than half were management roles, and removing three layers of management. In 2022 Centrica posted the highest annual earnings in its history, repeating the feat in 2023 with record first half earnings.

From 2019 to 2022, O'Shea forewent annual bonuses of several million pounds citing the hardships faced by consumers during COVID-19 pandemic and then the global energy crisis. In 2023, Centrica posted year-end profits of over £3 billion and O'Shea faced calls to forego his bonus again eventually settling for a package of over £4 million.

In January 2024, O'Shea gave an interview to BBC Breakfast, in which he said of his pay of £4.5 million in 2022: "You can't justify a salary of that size. It's a huge amount of money, I am incredibly fortunate. I don't set my own pay, that's set by our remuneration committee." In 2023, his remuneration increased to £8.2 million, which was criticised by the High Pay Centre.

Business positions
Preceded by Iain Conn	Chief Executive of Centrica; March 2020 –	Succeeded by Incumbent
