= Offset well =

An offset well is an existing wellbore that may be used as a guide for planning a well. Many offsets could be referred to in the planning of a well, to identify subsurface geology and pressures. Offset well data may be combined with seismic data and prior experience. Where offset data is lacking, well planners will be more conservative, allowing for a greater range of contingencies and expenses.

High quality offset well data is highly sought after by planners for optimizing their designs, and is also used retrospectively to benchmark performance. Offset data from competing companies is particularly coveted but very hard to obtain due to a profound reluctance by oil and gas operators to share their offset data with competitors.

As well planning becomes more complex, regulated and expensive, access to offset well data becomes increasingly important for well planning and benchmarking.
