= Centrica =

Multinational energy and services company

Centrica plc
- Formerly: Yieldtop PLC (1995–1996)
- Type: Public limited company
- Traded as: LSE: CNA; FTSE 100 component
- Industry: Utilities
- Predecessor: British Gas plc
- Founded: 17 February 1997; 29 years ago
- Headquarters: Windsor, Berkshire, England, UK
- Key people: Kevin O’Byrne (Chairman); Chris O'Shea (Group Chief Executive)
- Revenue: ▼£21,566 million (2025)
- Operating income: ▼£814 million (2025)
- Net income: ▼£(51) million (2025)
- Total assets: ▼£15,415 million (2025)
- Total equity: ▼£3,085 million (2025)
- Number of employees: 21,000 (2025)
- Subsidiaries: See below
- Website: www.centrica.com

Centrica plc is a British multinational energy and services company with its headquarters in Windsor, Berkshire, England.

It is the largest supplier of gas to domestic customers in the United Kingdom, and one of the largest suppliers of electricity, operating under the trading names British Gas in England and Wales, Scottish Gas in Scotland, and Bord Gáis Energy in Ireland.

Centrica is listed on the London Stock Exchange, and is a constituent of the FTSE 100 Index.

== History ==
=== Predecessors ===
The company has its historical origin in the Gas Light and Coke Company which incorporated in 1812. Over the next 137 years, it grew by acquisition of other gas companies to become the primary supplier of gas to Greater London. In 1949, under the Gas Act 1948 the ownership of the company transferred to a government agency, North Thames Gas Board. The various area gas boards were merged into the national British Gas Corporation in 1973. The Gas Act 1986 sold the company to private investors as British Gas plc.

=== Origin ===
Centrica became a separate, distinct corporation on 17 February 1997, when British Gas plc split (demerged) to form three separate companies: Centrica plc, BG plc and Transco plc. Centrica took over gas sales and gas trading, services and retail businesses, together with the gas production operations in the North and South Morecambe gas fields (Rampside Gas Terminal). The new company was a constituent of the FTSE 100 Index.

The company operates through three intermediary holding companies:

- British Gas Trading Ltd, founded in 1995.
- GB Gas Holdings Limited, founded 1996, which holds British Gas (also known as Scottish Gas).
- Centrica Hive Ltd, founded in 2007.

In 1998, Centrica's supplier monopoly for gas came to an end. Centrica maintained the British Gas retail brand but is only allowed to use this brand name in the United Kingdom. The electricity market also opened up to competition and, through the British Gas brand, the company started supplying its first domestic electricity customers.

=== 1998 to 2010 ===
At the end of 1998, under CEO Sir Roy Gardner and Finance Director Mark Clare, Centrica attempted to diversify – firstly by developing the Goldfish credit card, then in July 1999, by acquiring The AA for £1.1 billion. In July 2001, Centrica further diversified with the opportunistic purchase of the UK residential telecoms business of Australia's One.Tel.

Centrica also moved into the North American energy supply market, through the acquisition of the Canada-based company Direct Energy in July 2000, for £406 million. Direct Energy's operations were subsequently considerably expanded through a number of further acquisitions, including of Enbridge Services for £437 million in January 2002.

This strategy of diversification changed in the middle of 2003, possibly under pressure from major city shareholders to deliver better returns and/or possibly anticipating pressure on the core energy supply business. The change started with the sale of the Goldfish business to Lloyds TSB (who subsequently sold it to Morgan Stanley Bank International Limited).

Then, in July 2004, Centrica sold the AA to two private equity firms; Luxembourgish CVC and British Permira for £1.75 billion. In December 2005, Centrica sold their OneTel business to Carphone Warehouse. However, in October 2004 Centrica paid £57 million for Dyno-Rod, the emergency drainage franchiser, who had previously been contracted to carry out work for Centrica's customers who had bought drain and plumbing insurance.

From 2005, Centrica declared a strategy of consolidating within the energy sector, upstream and downstream, including expanding operations overseas. New chairman Roger Carr replaced retiring chairman Sir Michael Perry in 2005, whilst new CEO Sam Laidlaw picked up the reins from retiring CEO Sir Roy Gardner in March 2006.

In January 2006, it was rumoured that the Russian state-owned utility company Gazprom was seeking a takeover of Centrica. This created controversy in the media, while the Department for Trade and Industry stated any deal would be subject to "intense scrutiny". Tony Blair announced in April that he would not block any potential deal.

In September 2008, the company acquired the Caythorpe gas producing field near Bridlington to use for storage purposes. It also agreed to buy 20% of British Energy from EDF, financing this with a £2.2 billion, 3 for 8 rights issue. The rights issue offered shares at 160 pence per share and closed on 12 December 2008. In August 2009, Centrica took over Venture Production, a North Sea gas producer.

=== 2010 to 2019 ===
On 13 June 2010 Centrica, through Direct Energy, acquired Clockwork Home Services. Combining with the existing energy offer made Centrica the largest provider of heating and cooling, plumbing and electrical services in North America. On 17 November 2010, Centrica acquired the assets of heat pump installation company Cool Planet Technologies Ltd. for £0.5 million in cash. This aimed to boost the company's strategy of developing a broad range of low carbon technologies and advice.

In February 2012, Centrica signed a £2 billion three-year contract with Qatargas for the purchase of 2.4 million tonnes a year of liquefied natural gas. In March 2011, Centrica agreed the sale of the electricity and gas supply business of its Netherlands based subsidiary Oxxio to Eneco BV for €72 million (£63 million) in cash. The sale completed Centrica's exit from the supply of electricity and gas in Continental Europe, following the earlier disposal of its supply businesses in Belgium and Spain.

In November 2011, Centrica agreed to buy $1.6 billion stakes of eight fields on the Norwegian continental shelf from Statoil ASA. In a second deal, Centrica agreed to buy five billion cubic meters a year gas from the same company from 2015 to 2025 as equal to 5% of gas consumption in the United Kingdom. Centrica's Germany based trading division Centrica Energie GmbH was closed in April 2012.

In July 2013, it was announced that Centrica would acquire the energy marketing unit of Hess Corporation for $1.03 billion. In March 2014, Centrica acquired the retail arm and other assets belonging to Ireland's state owned Bord Gáis for a fee of around €1.1 billion. In 2010, Centrica entered into joint venture arrangements with Tullow Oil to explore for oil in the South Lokichar Basin in Kenya.

In August 2014, Tullow, the operator, revealed significant oil discoveries had been made in the Etom 1 exploration well and testing block 10BB, which expanded the already proven South Lokichar Basin "significantly northwards," taking in an additional 247 km^{2}. In September 2013, Centrica established Hive as part of its Connected Home offering, building on its Remote Heating Control service provided through its British Gas subsidiary.

In February 2015, in light of significantly changed circumstances, a fundamental strategic review was launched. This focused on outlook and sources of growth; portfolio mix and capital intensity; operating capability and efficiency; and group financial framework. The review was a detailed analysis of the group's prospects, led by Centrica's senior management. It concluded that Centrica's strength lay in being a customer-facing business and that all activities and priorities would focus on meeting customers' changing needs. The shape of the group would be reworked to reflect this, including one group-wide efficiency programme that would reduce employee numbers by around 6,000.

Also in February 2015, under its British Gas brand, Centrica completed the acquisition of AlertMe, a connected home company based in the United Kingdom that provided innovative energy management products and services. In November 2015, Direct Energy also acquired Panoramic Power, a provider of device-level energy management technology, for $60 million (£39 million).

In April 2016, Centrica acquired Neas Energy A/S (Neas), one of Europe's providers of energy management and revenue optimisation services for decentralised third-party owned assets. It also acquired ENER-G Cogen International Limited ("ENER-G Cogen"), an established supplier and operator of combined heat and power (CHP) systems and REstore NV, Europe's demand response aggregator.

In June 2017, it was announced that the CQ Energy Canada Partnership, the Canadian exploration and production joint venture in which Centrica owned a 60% interest, was to be sold to a consortium comprising MIE Holdings Corporation, The Can-China Global Resource Fund and Mercuria for a purchase price of C$722 million (£413 million) in cash.

On 21 June 2017, the company agreed to sell its operational Langage and South Humber Bank combined cycle gas turbine power stations, with a combined capacity of 2.3 GW, to EP UK Investments Ltd for £318million in cash.

On 11 December 2017, Centrica combined its North Sea exploration & production business with Bayerngas Norge, to form a joint venture named Spirit Energy with the German, Austrian and Swiss owners of Bayerngas, led by German energy and infrastructure firm Stadtwerke München (SWM).

In December 2017, the Competition and Markets Authority agreed to grant Centrica plc and Centrica Storage Limited's (CSL's) request to be released from the Rough Undertakings. CSL decided that it could no longer operate Rough as a storage facility as the facility was no longer capable of safe injection operations due to its age and condition and that due to the economics of seasonal storage, neither refurbishing or rebuilding the facility would be cost-effective.

The British Gas brand lost 750,000 domestic customers in 2017 amid intense competition, contributing to a February 2018 announcement that 4,000 jobs would be cut. Centrica cut its dividend in July 2019, after making a loss of £446 million in the prior six months.

=== Since 2020 ===
In the spring of 2020, following the onset of the COVID-19 pandemic, offices and factories shut and energy use decreased sharply, and the financial problems caused by the pandemic among Centrica's customers were expected to lead to bad debts. Analysts dropped their estimate of Centrica's earnings for 2020, 2021, and 2022 by 30%, and Centrica paused its search for a buyer for its 69% stake in Spirit Energy. The share price in April reached a record low of £0.30, valuing the company at less than half of its net debt of nearly £4bn. In June 2020, Centrica's shares were moved from the FTSE 100 to the FTSE 250 Index. The same month, the company announced that it would cut 5,000 jobs, half of them from leadership, management and corporate departments. In 2020 Centrica employed about 27,000 people, with 20,000 based in the UK. The employee cuts are to be a result of a restructuring plan designed to simplify and create a smaller group that is focused on delivery to their customers. British Gas engineers employed by Centrica began a strike in January 2021, which was extended into February, and was eventually called off by the GMB union after 44 days of strike action, after members endorsed a new pay deal.

In July 2020, Centrica announced the sale of its subsidiary of Direct Energy in North America for $3.63 billion to NRG Energy, in order to put more focus into its home markets. The money from the sale is to be put to the reduction of net debt and to the contribution of pension plans.

On 1 June 2022, it was announced that it would be promoted from the FTSE 250, and it became a constituent of the FTSE 100 Index effective on 20 June.

In February 2023, Centrica reported a large operating profit in 2022; it increased due to the jump in energy prices after the Russian invasion of Ukraine. Centrica's operating profit for 2022 was more than triple its profit for 2021.

In July 2023, Centrica finalised an $8 billion agreement to purchase liquefied natural gas (LNG) from a new floating production facility in the Gulf of Mexico.

In June 2023, Centrica opened the 18 MW Codford Solar Farm in Wiltshire, marking Centrica’s first major solar asset.

In June 2024, Centrica launched new research and innovation venture – ‘Energised Futures’, aimed to uncover ways to make energy simpler and more affordable for consumers.

In 2025, profits fell by 39%, largely due to milder weather reducing sales, and subsequently Centrica paused its share repurchase scheme. During the year it acquired the Grain LNG Terminal east of London for £1.5 billion, and it was poised for a major investment into building Sizewell C nuclear power station.

== Shareholdings ==
In May 2009, Centrica purchased a 20% stake in nuclear power generator British Energy from EDF Energy. The company now produces 14.3% of its electricity from nuclear plants (the second highest rate in the United Kingdom), helping it to achieve the lowest carbon emissions of the major providers. Centrica has also acquired an option to purchase a 20% stake in EDF's subsidiary NNB Generation Company (NNB GenCo).

In December 2017, Centrica launched a new company as a joint venture with German energy and infrastructure firm Stadtwerke München (SWM). Spirit Energy, an exploration and production (E&P) company, is the result of a combination of Centrica's E&P business and Bayerngas Norge AS, which was formerly majority-owned by SWM. Centrica plc owns 69% of Spirit Energy, with Bayerngas Norge's former shareholders, led by SWM and Bayerngas GmbH, owning 31%.

In July 2025, Centrica acquired a 15% stake in the Sizewell C nuclear power station, with an option to buy a further 2.4% from the UK Government within 24 months.

== Senior management ==
Sam Laidlaw was the chief executive of Centrica between 1 July 2006 and 31 December 2014. In the 2010 financial year Laidlaw received a salary of £941,000 and a bonus of £900,000.

Iain Conn was appointed Group Chief Executive of Centrica on 1 January 2015; he had previously been BP's chief executive, downstream (BP's refining and marketing division) for seven years.

Group Chief Financial Officer, Chris O'Shea, was appointed Interim Group Chief Executive of Centrica on 17 March 2020.

Nick Baird was group corporate affairs director from 2014 to 2022.

== Controversies ==
=== Greenwashing ===
British Gas was accused of greenwashing in the advertising of its Zero Carbon tariff in January 2008, after the Advertising Standards Authority upheld a complaint about the 'greenest domestic tariff' claim.

=== Customer complaint response ===
In July 2011, British Gas was fined £2.5 million by the energy regulator Ofgem for failing to deal properly with customer complaints.

Ofgem found that British Gas failed to reopen complaints from customers who indicated they felt the matter was not resolved adequately, failed to provide sufficient information to complainants about the energy ombudsman service, and failed to deal properly with complaints from micro-businesses because it had not implemented the necessary processes and practices.

A spokesperson for British Gas said the company felt that finding it in breach of rules for failing to provide adequate information to consumers about the energy ombudsman was "disproportionate to the mistake".

British Gas Business was fined £1 million in July 2011 after Ofgem's investigation found the company had misreported the amount of electricity supplied under the British government's renewables obligation. British Gas claims it spotted the problem – it said an over-reporting of the amount of renewable energy it was supplying caused by human error – and notified the regulator.

=== Political activity ===
Centrica entered the political arena in February 2014, by threatening an investment strike in response to the Labour Party's proposal for a price freeze. Caroline Flint, the shadow energy secretary, said: "It is not acceptable for companies to threaten that the lights will go out because they don't want greater transparency, competition and accountability".

Centrica, in conjunction with Cuadrilla Resources, funded the North West Energy Task Force which on 8 January 2015 organised an Open Letter to Lancashire County Council in support of fracking. This letter was signed by Jane Watson, sister of Robert Altham, the judge who sentenced three anti-fracking protesters to jail in September 2018.
