= Stadtwerke München =

German communal company

- Type: GmbH
- Industry: energy supply water supply steam and air conditioning supply
- Founded: 11 August 1998
- Headquarters: Munich, Germany
- Area served: Munich and region
- Key people: Florian Bieberbach (CEO)
- Services: Public services
- Revenue: €6,349,000,000 (2025)
- Owner: City of Munich
- Number of employees: 12,145 (2025)
- Website: www.swm.de/english

Stadtwerke München GmbH (Munich City Utilities), or SWM, is a German company owned by the city of Munich which provides public services to the city and the region of Munich. The company supplies electricity to more than 95 percent of Munich's 750,000 households, as well as natural gas, drinking water and (through its stake in M-net Telekommunikations GmbH) telecommunications services. According to the company, SWM is Europe's largest municipal utility company and is among Germany's principal energy providers. Expanding use of renewable energy has been a central element of the company's strategy since 2008. Through its subsidiary, Münchner Verkehrsgesellschaft (MVG, founded in 2001), SWM administers most of the inner-city public transportation network by maintaining the Munich U-Bahn and the Munich tram and bus service.

== Products ==
=== Electricity ===
As M-Strom, SWM offers electricity and related services to private and business customers in Munich, the surrounding and nationwide. With more than 250,000 green energy customers, SWM calls itself one of the largest providers of green electricity in the private and commercial markets in Germany. In Munich and the surrounding region, The company operates thirteen hydroelectric power plants, many plants which generate electricity from renewable energy, and three cogeneration power plants (Nord, Süd and Freimann) which generate about 70 percent of their electricity through cogeneration.

=== Natural gas ===
SWM supplies natural gas as part of the trans-European network, and the company can draw on its underground storage. It offers a variety of natural-gas rates, some of which are available nationwide. In Munich, SWM operates ten natural gas stations where cars can fill up on renewable bio-methane.

=== District heating ===
When generating electricity by cogeneration, heat is created which then enters the district heating grid from SWM's cogeneration plants. SWM produces district heating in its cogeneration and heating plants which supplies large buildings and households over 800 kilometers of steam and hot water networks, which is used for heating and hot water. Connection to the SWM district-heating network is possible in an increasing number of Munich districts. By 2040, the aim is to produce 100 percent of district heating in Munich carbon-neutrally.

=== District cooling ===
Compared to, District cooling has less of an environmental impact and is more energy-efficient than conventional air conditioning systems, requiring about half of the primary energy. Cold ground water is used as the energy source for cooling in a closed-loop system, and only the pumps use electricity. The slightly-warmed groundwater is then returned to the groundwater system.

=== Water ===
About 75 percent of Munich's drinking water comes from the Mangfalltal valley, near Weyarn in Upper Bavaria; 20 percent is sourced from the Loisachtal valley near Garmisch-Partenkirchen, between Oberau and Farchant. The southern area of the Munich gravel plain is a reserve for peak demand. The quality of the city's drinking water is partially attributable to the procurement areas in the Bavarian Alpine foothills and the region's sustainable forestry.

=== Swimming pools ===
SWM operates nine indoor and eight outdoor swimming pools in Munich. The company's operations deliver the "Munich swimming pool concept" adopted by the city council in 1991, which provided for the improvement of the city's swimming pools. Munich has three complexes of indoor and outdoor pools: Westbad on Weinbergerstrasse in the west, and Michaelibad on Heinrich-Wieland-Strasse in the east. Michaelibad is the larger pool complex. At Dantebad an outdoor pool and a heated outdoor winter pool are combined.

=== Energy advice ===
The company offers energy-saving advice for low-income households in conjunction with Munich-based charities.

== Renewable-energy project ==
In 2008, SWM began a project to expand the use of renewable energy. By 2025, the company aimed to produce as much green electricity with its plants as consumed by the city of Munich: about 7.5 billion kilowatt hours annually. The renewable-energy-expansion initiative had a budget of about €9 billion. SWM has a stake in offshore wind parks which include Global Tech I, Gwynt y Môr and DanTysk. Projects such as the Sandbank offshore wind park were in the planning phase in 2014. The goal of the expansion initiative was achieved: since 2025, SWM has been able to generate as much green electricity in its own facilities as the entire city of Munich consumes.

== Public transport ==
Münchner Verkehrsgesellschaft mbH (MVG), a subsidiary of SWM, provides subway, bus and tram transport in Munich.

== Telecommunications ==
With its subsidiary M-net Telekommunikations GmbH, SWM is building a fiber-optic network in Munich. M-net is also investing in the expansion of fiber-optic broadband networks in other parts of Bavaria. They are available in over 50 percent of Bavarian households and for private and business customers in the Greater Ulm region.

== SWM Education Foundation ==
SWM founded the SWM Education Foundation in November 2007. The foundation promotes measures and projects and provides vocational training. To mark its fifth anniversary in 2013, it introduced a scholarship program and an award. The scholarship program is aimed at students studying engineering, the natural sciences, economics and IT in Munich and the surrounding region. The €10,000 award has been presented every year since then in recognition of efforts in the field of education for disadvantaged children, teens and young adults.

== Stadtwerke Project ==
Disadvantaged young people are supported by the Stadtwerke Project educational initiative. The project has worked with the city's youth welfare office to offer about five young people per year technical-commercial vocational training at SWM, in connection with career-related advice and socio-educational support. The young people receive vocational training and support in leading an independent life.
