= British Franchise Association =

Trade association in the UK

The British Franchise Association (bfa) is a trade association for the British franchising industry established in 1977. It had offices in Abingdon.

It claims to be the voice of ethical franchising in the UK and members must go through an accreditation process. They are required to abide by the European Code for Franchising. The bfa has various levels of membership, including franchisors, franchisees, affiliate advisors and suppliers to the franchising industry.

It runs annual award ceremonies. In August 2019 it predicted that the Scottish franchise market would be worth £1 billion by 2021. They produced a report with NatWest in January 2019 which found that businesses that operated under a Franchise License contributed in excess of £17 billion to the UK economy in 2018.

In June 2021 it was announced that the British Franchise Association would "join forces" and merge with the Approved Franchise Association.
