= ERT =

ERT may refer to:

== Broadcasting ==
- ESPN Regional Television, a college football and basketball syndicator
- Hellenic Broadcasting Corporation (Ellinikí Radiofonía Tileórasi), Greece's public broadcaster
- Ente Radio Trieste, public service radio broadcaster of the Free Territory of Trieste

== Health and medicine ==
- ERT (company), an American clinical research company
- Enzyme replacement therapy
- Estrogen receptor test
- Estrogen replacement therapy

== Sport ==
- European Racquetball Tour
- European Rally Trophy
- EOC country code for the EOC Refugee Team
- ERT Formula E Team

== Technology ==
- Earth-received time, used when dealing with interplanetary spacecraft
- Electrical resistivity tomography
- Encoder receiver transmitter, a packet radio protocol

== Other uses ==
- Elektrooniline Riigi Teataja, the official web publication of laws of the Republic of Estonia
- Elizabeth River Tunnels Project, an infrastructure project in Virginia
- Emergency response team, or Emergency rescue team
  - Emergency Response Team (RCMP) of the Royal Canadian Mounted Police
  - Evidence Response Team of the FBI
  - Nuclear power plant emergency response team
- Eritai language
- Eritrean Airlines
- European Round Table for Industry, a European organization that represents companies from the European industrial sector, formerly known as the European Round Table of Industrialists
- Exclusive ride time, in amusement parks
