= Nielsen Media Research =

American audience measurement service

- Formerly: ACNielsen
- Type: Subsidiary
- Industry: Media research
- Founded: 1996; 30 years ago
- Headquarters: 85 Broad Street, New York City, New York, U.S.
- Area served: Worldwide
- Services: Consumerization
- Parent: Nielsen Holdings
- Website: nielsen.com

Nielsen Media Research (NMR) is an American firm that measures media audiences, including television, radio, theatre, films (via the AMC Theatres MAP program), and newspapers. Headquartered in New York City, it is best known for the Nielsen ratings, an audience measurement system of television viewership that has long been the deciding factor in canceling or renewing television shows by television networks. As of August 2024, it is the primary part of Nielsen Holdings.

NMR began as a division of ACNielsen, a marketing research firm founded in 1923. In 1996, NMR was split off into an independent company, and in 1999, it was purchased by the Dutch conglomerate VNU. In 2001, VNU also purchased ACNielsen, bringing both companies under the same corporate umbrella for years. NMR is also a sister company to Nielsen//NetRatings, which measures Internet and digital media audiences. VNU was reorganized and renamed the Nielsen Company in 2007. NMR was separated again from NielsenIQ (the former ACNielsen) in 2021.

== History ==
The Nielsen TV ratings have been produced in the United States since the 1950–51 television season, statistically measuring which programs are watched by segments of the American population. The most well-known portion is the "diary". During the four "sweeps" months of February, May, July and November, Nielsen interviewers in Oldsmar, Florida, and Radcliff, Kentucky, ask homes to fill out a one-week diary of the programs watched in their household.

The Nielsen sample included about 1,700 homes with audiometers and a rotating group of nearly 850 diary respondents by the early 1980s. Nielsen launched its Nielsen Homevideo Index (NHI) in 1980 to measure cable, pay cable, and VCRs; the NHI began offering daily cable ratings in 1982, with steady expansions made into the mid-2000s. In 2003, Nielsen began adjusting its counting methods and emphasized its sample in response to demographic changes and requests from some industry sectors. Nielsen introduced its automated Local People Meter (LPM) technology in New York and Los Angeles. The LPM enhanced Nielsen's measurement method by shifting from an active, diary-based system to a passive, meter-monitored one. The LPM accurately measures local-level markets instead of relying on a national sample. While diary-based surveys focused on quarterly sweeps, the industry has shifted towards year-round measurement thanks to the automated LPM system.

In 1996, Nielsen Media Research began tracking computer, internet, and video game usage through telephone surveys. Nielsen Media Research is a sister company to Nielsen NetRatings, which measures internet and digital media audiences l telephone and internet surveys, and Nielsen BuzzMetrics, which measures consumer-generated media. Nielsen also conducts market research for the film industry through National Research Group (NRG).

In September 2018, Nielsen acquired SuperData Research, an industry analysis firm that tracks viewing habits within the video game and esports spaces, which Nielsen planned to expand into. Later, in April 2021, Nielsen stated it would close SuperData and merge its analysis and tracking into Nielsen Sports.

In September 2020, Nielsen began compiling a weekly top 10 list of most-watched shows on streaming platforms.

After the divestiture of NielsenIQ (the former ACNielsen consumer research business) in 2021, Nielsen became solely a media audience measurement and analytics firm.

== Nielsen TV ratings ==
Nielsen TV ratings (commonly referred to as Nielsen ratings) are the audience measurement systems operated by Nielsen Media Research that seek to determine the audience size and composition of television programming in the United States using a rating system. Nielsen lost accreditation by the Media Rating Council (MRC) in 2022 due to inaccurate data reporting during the COVID-19 pandemic, but regained it in April 2023.

Nielsen Media Research was founded by Arthur C. Nielsen, a market analyst who began his career in the 1920s with marketing research and performance analysis. The company subsequently expanded into radio market analysis in the late 1930s, culminating in the Nielsen Radio Index in 1942, which was meant to provide statistics as to the markets of radio shows. The first Nielsen ratings for radio programs were released the first week of December 1947. They measured the top 20 programs in four areas: total audience, average audience, cumulative audience, and homes per dollar spent for time and talent.

In 1950, Nielsen then moved to television, developing a rating system using the methods he and his company had developed for radio. That method became the primary source of audience measurement information in the American television industry. In September 2020, Nielsen began compiling a weekly top 10 list of most-watched shows on streaming platforms.

=== Measuring ratings ===
The data collection methods used to generate Nielsen TV ratings included:

- The Audimeter (audience meter) was used from 1950 during the early days of television broadcasting. It attached to a television and recorded the channels viewed, onto a 16mm film cartridge that was mailed weekly to company headquarters in Evanston, Illinois, and used to generate the Nielsen Television Index. It was based on an earlier Audimeter that had been developed for the 1942 Nielsen Radio Index. Randomly selected "Nielsen families" homes were enticed to accept the Audimeter by including free TV repair service provided by TV Index reps, which was a valuable commodity when vacuum tube televisions predominated.
- Paper "viewer diaries", in which a household recruited by the company self-recorded its viewing or listening habits. This adjunct Nielsen Station Index Service offered since 1953 targeted various demographics, particularly for local programming. The resulting statistical models provided a report of the audiences of any given show, network, and programming hour. The company phased out this methodology as electronic data collection became more sophisticated. As of June 28, 2018, the Nielsen paper TV diary rating service was retired.
- In 1971, the Storage Instantaneous Audimeter allowed electronically recorded program viewing history to be forwarded to Nielsen via a telephone line, making overnight ratings possible.
- The upgraded People Meter, introduced in 1987, records individual viewing habits of the home and transmits the data nightly to Nielsen through a telephone line. This system is designed to allow market researchers to study television viewing on a minute-to-minute basis, recording when viewers change channels or turn off their television.
- Nielsen replaced People Meters with Portable People Meters (PPM), which collects the data of individual household members through the use of separate login credentials and allows the company to separate household viewing information into diverse demographic groups.

Changing systems of viewing have impacted Nielsen's methods of market research. In 2005, Nielsen began measuring the usage of digital video recording devices (DVRs) such as TiVos. Initial results indicated that time-shifted viewing (i.e., programs that are watched after the networks have aired them) would significantly impact television ratings. A year later, the networks were not factoring these new results into their ad rates because of advertisers' resistance.

In July 2017, Nielsen announced that it would include select programs from subscription-based video on demand (SVOD) services Hulu and YouTube TV in its Digital in TV Ratings system. Since about October 2017, Nielsen also began to track select programs from Netflix. Partnering distributors insert a "tag" into the program to be distributed on these services, which Nielsen then tracks through its meters system. Partnering distributors are able to determine if these ratings can be released publicly or not.

=== Ratings/share and total viewers ===
The most commonly cited Nielsen results are reported in two measurements: ratings points and share, usually reported as: "ratings points/share". There were 119.6 million TV homes in the United States for the 2017–18 TV season (Nielsen's National Television Household Universe, or Households Using Television, HUT). Nielsen re-estimates the number of television-equipped households each August for the upcoming television season.

The rating of a program is a fraction of the HUT. It is calculated as RTG = HUT × SHARE where HUT (or PUT when measuring demos) is Homes Using Television and SHARE is the percentage of TV sets in use which are tuned to a particular show.

Share is the percentage of television sets in use, Households Using Television (HUT) or Persons Using Television (PUT) who are tuned to a specific program, station or network in a specific area at a specific time. For example, Nielsen may report a show as receiving a 4.4/8 during its broadcast; this would mean that they estimate that 4.4% of all television-equipped households (that is to say, homes with a TV, not total number of people) were tuned in to that program, while 8% of households that were watching TV at that time were watching the specific program.

Because ratings are based on samples, it is possible for shows to get a 0.0 rating, despite having an audience; CNBC's talk show McEnroe was one notable example. Another example is The CW show, CW Now, which received two 0.0 ratings in the same season. In 2014, Nielsen reported that American viewership of live television (totaling on average four hours and 32 minutes per day) had dropped 12 minutes per day compared to the year before. The CW got another 0.0 rating for its broadcast of the 1st Critics Choice Super Awards. Nielsen reported several reasons for the shift away from live television: increased viewership of time-shifted television (mainly through DVRs) and viewership of internet video (clips from video sharing websites and streams of full-length television shows).

==== Viewer location: out of home, on the go ====
In 2007, Nielsen began to release data that reflected out-of-home/not via home TV viewing. This was a follow-up to their added inclusiveness regarding family members who are dorming in college.

==== Demographics ====
Since specific demographics influence advertising rates, Nielsen provides statistics by categories including age, sex, race, economic class, and area. For example, an advertiser might look for younger viewers, for older or wealthier audiences, or for women rather than men.

In general, the number of viewers within the 18–49 age range is more important than the total number of viewers. According to Advertising Age, during the 2007–08 season, ABC was able to charge $419,000 per commercial sold during its medical drama Grey's Anatomy, compared to only $248,000 for a commercial during CBS' CSI: Crime Scene Investigation, despite CSI having almost five million more viewers overall. Because of its strength in young "demos" (demographic groups), NBC was able to charge almost three times as much for a commercial during Friends as CBS charged for Murder, She Wrote, even though the two series had a similar amount of total viewership during the two seasons they were on the air concurrently. Glee (on Fox) and The Office (on NBC) drew fewer total viewers than NCIS (on CBS) during the 2009–10 season, but earned an average of $272,694 and $213,617 respectively, compared to $150,708 for NCIS.

==== Commercial ratings ====
Nielsen also provides viewership data calculated as the average viewership for only the commercial time within the program. These "Commercial Ratings" first became available on May 31, 2007. Additionally, Nielsen provides different "streams" of this data in order to take into consideration delayed viewing (DVR) data, at any interval up to seven days. C3 (Live + 3) was the metric launched in 2007, and refers to the ratings for average commercial minutes in live programming plus total playback by digital video recorder up to three days after. In 2009, dissatisfaction with Nielsen's effectiveness resulted in formation of the Council for Innovative Media Measurement by more than six major broadcast media companies.

By the end of 2012, some television executives wanted to see C7 (Live + 7), ratings for live plus seven days, with CBS Corporation chief executive officer Les Moonves making the claim C7 made ratings increase by 30%.

==== Sweeps ====
The American television measurement by Nielsen is based on three different methodological approaches. In the 25 TV markets with the highest sales (e.g. New York, Los Angeles, Chicago, Denver), the Local People Meter (LPM) is measured. Individuals register individually; the measurement is carried out on 365 days over 24 hours. The SET Meter (Diary & Electronic) is used in 31 smaller markets (such as Nashville, Salt Lake City). In four sweeps in February, May, July, and November, target group data are collected with the diary and validated with the data of the devices (TV set on/off) in the participating households. In the 154 TV markets with the lowest sales (e. g. Harrisburg, PA or Honolulu) the use of TV is only recorded using a diary survey.

Each year until 2018, Nielsen processed approximately two million paper diaries from households across the United States, for November, February, May, and July—also known as the "sweeps" rating periods. The term "sweeps" dates from 1954, when Nielsen collected diaries from households in the Eastern United States first; from there they would "sweep" west. Seven-day diaries (or eight-day diaries in homes with DVRs) were mailed to homes to keep a tally of what was watched on each television set and by whom. Over the course of a sweeps period, diaries were mailed to a new panel of homes each week. At the end of the month, all of the viewing data from the individual weeks was aggregated. One exception to the normal sweeps periods occurred in 2008–09 when the February sweeps period was moved to March to accommodate the digital television transition, which was scheduled to take place on February 17, 2009. The transition date was later moved to June 12, but Nielsen kept the sweeps period in March that year rather than moving it again.

This local viewing information provides a basis for program scheduling and advertising decisions for local television stations, cable systems, and advertisers. Typically, the November, February, and May sweeps are considered more important; nevertheless, the July sweeps can have a local impact regarding personnel.

In some mid-size markets, diaries provide viewer information for up to two additional "sweeps" months (October and January).

Transition to Electronic Measurement (2018–Present)

The historical paper diary methodology described above has been retired. By 2018, Nielsen completed a full phase-out of paper diaries, replacing them with more advanced, year-round electronic measurement tools.

As of 2025, while the traditional "sweeps" months (November, February, May, July) are still used as key reporting periods for advertising contracts, the data collection itself is continuous. The current system relies on a hierarchy of electronic methods:

1. Local People Meters (LPMs): Used in the 25 largest "Designated Market Areas" (DMAs), like New York and Los Angeles. These devices electronically track what is being watched and by whom on a 365-day basis.
2. Set Meters / RPD: In mid-sized markets, Nielsen uses "Set Meters" (which electronically record what channel is being watched) combined with anonymous "Return Path Data" (RPD) from cable and satellite set-top boxes.
3. RPD and Modeling: In the smallest markets, measurement relies heavily on Return Path Data and advanced data modeling.

Nielsen Local TV Survey Periods (2024–2025)
Survey Period	Survey Dates
November 2024	October 31 – November 27, 2024
February 2025	January 30 – February 26, 2025
May 2025	April 24 – May 21, 2025
July 2025	June 26 – July 23, 2025

==== Criticism of ratings systems ====
There is some public critique regarding accuracy and potential bias within Nielsen's rating system, including some concerns that the Nielsen ratings system is rapidly becoming outdated due to new technology such as smartphones, DVRs, tablet computers and Internet streaming services as preferred or alternative methods for television viewing. In June 2006, however, Nielsen announced a plan to revamp its entire methodology to include all types of media viewing in its sample. Since viewers are aware of being part of the Nielsen sample, it can lead to response bias in recording and viewing habits. Audience counts gathered by the self-reporting diary methodology are sometimes higher than those gathered by the electronic meters, eliminating any response bias.

Another criticism of the measuring system itself is that it is not random. A small fraction of the population is selected, and only those accepted are used as the sample size. In many local areas during the 1990s, the difference between a rating that kept a show on the air and one that would cancel it was so small as to be statistically insignificant. Yet, the show with the higher rating would survive. In addition, the Nielsen ratings encouraged a strong push for demographic measurements. This caused problems with households with multiple television sets or households where viewers would enter the simpler codes (usually their child's), raising questions about the demographic data quality. The situation further deteriorated as the popularity of cable television increased the number of viewable networks to the extent that the margin of error has increased because the sampling sizes are too small. Compounding matters is that of the sample data that is collected, advertisers will not pay for time shifted programs (those that are recorded for replay at a different time), rendering the "raw" numbers useless from a statistical point of view. In 2013, it was noted that Internet streams of television programs were still not counted because they had either no ads (such as Netflix) or totally different advertising (such as Hulu) than their television counterparts, effectively skewing the raw data on a show's popularity.

A related criticism of the Nielsen rating system is its lack of a system for measuring television audiences outside homes, such as college dormitories, transport terminals, bars, prisons and other public places where television is frequently viewed, often by large numbers of people in a common setting. In 2005, Nielsen announced plans to incorporate viewing by away-from-home college students into its sample. Internet television viewing is another rapidly growing market for which Nielsen ratings fail to account for viewers. iTunes, Hulu, YouTube, and some of the networks' own websites (such as ABC.com and CBS.com) provide full-length web-based programming, either subscription-based or ad-supported. Though websites can already track a site's popularity and the referring page, they cannot track viewer demographics. To both track this and expand their market research offerings, Nielsen purchased NetRatings in 2007. However, as noted in a February 2012 New York Times article, the computer and mobile streams of a program are counted separately from the standard television broadcasts, further degrading the overall quality of the sampling data. As a result, there was no way for NBC to tell if there was any overlap between the roughly 111.3 million traditional television viewers and 2.1 million live stream viewers of Super Bowl XLVII.

Responding to the criticism regarding accusations by several media executives (including Viacom CEO Phillippe Dauman and former Fox Entertainment Group chief operating officer Chase Carey) that it failed to count viewers watching television programs on digital platforms, Nielsen executive vice president of global product leadership Megan Clarken stated in an April 2015 summit by the Coalition for Innovative Media Measurement that the company can count digital viewers in audience and demographic reports but is unable to do so under the current set of rules devised by networks and advertising industries last revised in 2006. As such, Nielsen can only count viewership for television-originated broadcasts, and must exclude viewers who watch programs on digital platforms if the program does not have an identical advertising load or a linear watermark.

After Nielsen took over the contract for producing data on Irish advertising in 2009, agencies said that they were "disastrous" and claimed that the information produced by them is too inaccurate to be trusted by them or their clients.

In 2004, News Corporation retained the services of public relations firm Glover Park to launch a campaign aimed at delaying Nielsen's plan to replace its aging household electronic data collection methodology in larger local markets with its newer electronic People Meter system. The advocates in the public relations campaign claimed that data derived from the newer People Meter system represented a bias toward underreporting minority viewing, leading to a de facto discrimination in employment against minority actors and writers. However, Nielsen countered the campaign by revealing its sample composition counts. According to Nielsen Media Research's sample composition counts, as of November 2004, nationwide, African American households using People Meters represented 6.7% of the Nielsen sample, compared to 6.0% in the general population. Latino households represent 5.7% of the Nielsen sample, compared to 5.0% in the general population. By October 2006, News Corporation and Nielsen settled, with Nielsen agreeing to spend an additional $50 million to ensure that minority viewing was not being underreported by the new electronic people meter system.

In 2011, CBS and Nielsen proposed a model consisting of six viewer segments, which according to their empirical research, are more relevant for advertisers than older models based on gender and age. The segments are based on user behavior, motivations, and psychographics. It is argued that the model can increase reaching the desired audience and message recall and advertisement likeability.

=== Advent of streaming ===
In September 2020, Nielsen began releasing a weekly list of top 10 television shows most watched on streaming platforms or subscription video on demand (SVOD).

In 2021, Nielsen announced Nielsen Streaming Video Ratings, a service meant to measure total viewership and audience demographics on streaming platforms. This service is powered by Nielsen's NPOWER audience insights platform, which allows studios, platforms, and advertisers to know which demographics are interacting with content.

==== Big Data + Panel ====
In January 2025, Nielsen gained accreditation for its Big Data + Panel methodology from the Media Rating Council (MRC). This measurement product is a hybrid of a traditional panel (from cable and satellite set-top boxes) and big data products such as digital media players and smart TVs (including partners such as Roku and Vizio) that is inclusive of person-level estimates across 45 million households and 75 million devices. The methodology was adopted as the system of record for all Nielsen-monitored ratings data beginning in September 2025.

The Big Data + Panel methodology has had a noticeable impact on ratings of sports telecasts since its adoption, as it is more inclusive of streaming viewership than previous measurements.

== Top-rated programs in the United States ==
The table below lists television series in the United States with the highest average household Nielsen rating for each television season.

Season	Live				Live + 3 DVR			Live + 7 DVR		
Season	Show	Network	Households (in millions)	Viewers (in millions)	Show	Network	Viewers (in millions)	Show	Network	Viewers (in millions)
1950s
1950–1951	Texaco Star Theatre	NBC	6.28	Unknown	—N/a	—N/a	—N/a	—N/a	—N/a	—N/a
1951–1952	Arthur Godfrey's Talent Scouts	CBS	8.23	Unknown	—N/a	—N/a	—N/a	—N/a	—N/a	—N/a
1952–1953	I Love Lucy	CBS	13.73	Unknown	—N/a	—N/a	—N/a	—N/a	—N/a	—N/a
1953–1954	I Love Lucy	CBS	15.29	Unknown	—N/a	—N/a	—N/a	—N/a	—N/a	—N/a
1954–1955	I Love Lucy	CBS	15.14	Unknown	—N/a	—N/a	—N/a	—N/a	—N/a	—N/a
1955–1956	The $64,000 Question	CBS	16.58	Unknown	—N/a	—N/a	—N/a	—N/a	—N/a	—N/a
1956–1957	I Love Lucy	CBS	17.00	Unknown	—N/a	—N/a	—N/a	—N/a	—N/a	—N/a
1957–1958	Gunsmoke	CBS	18.07	Unknown	—N/a	—N/a	—N/a	—N/a	—N/a	—N/a
1958–1959	Gunsmoke	CBS	17.40	Unknown	—N/a	—N/a	—N/a	—N/a	—N/a	—N/a
1959–1960	Gunsmoke	CBS	18.44	Unknown	—N/a	—N/a	—N/a	—N/a	—N/a	—N/a
1960s
1960–1961	Gunsmoke	CBS	17.61	Unknown	—N/a	—N/a	—N/a	—N/a	—N/a	—N/a
1961–1962	Wagon Train	NBC	15.59	Unknown	—N/a	—N/a	—N/a	—N/a	—N/a	—N/a
1962–1963	The Beverly Hillbillies	CBS	18.11	Unknown	—N/a	—N/a	—N/a	—N/a	—N/a	—N/a
1963–1964	The Beverly Hillbillies	CBS	20.18	Unknown	—N/a	—N/a	—N/a	—N/a	—N/a	—N/a
1964–1965	Bonanza	NBC	19.13	Unknown	—N/a	—N/a	—N/a	—N/a	—N/a	—N/a
1965–1966	Bonanza	NBC	17.12	Unknown	—N/a	—N/a	—N/a	—N/a	—N/a	—N/a
1966–1967	Bonanza	NBC	16.04	Unknown	—N/a	—N/a	—N/a	—N/a	—N/a	—N/a
1967–1968	The Andy Griffith Show	CBS	15.64	Unknown	—N/a	—N/a	—N/a	—N/a	—N/a	—N/a
1968–1969	Rowan & Martin's Laugh-In	NBC	18.52	Unknown	—N/a	—N/a	—N/a	—N/a	—N/a	—N/a
1969–1970	Rowan & Martin's Laugh-In	NBC	15.39	Unknown	—N/a	—N/a	—N/a	—N/a	—N/a	—N/a
1970s
1970–1971	Marcus Welby, M.D.	ABC	17.79	Unknown	—N/a	—N/a	—N/a	—N/a	—N/a	—N/a
1971–1972	All in the Family	CBS	21.11	Unknown	—N/a	—N/a	—N/a	—N/a	—N/a	—N/a
1972–1973	All in the Family	CBS	21.58	Unknown	—N/a	—N/a	—N/a	—N/a	—N/a	—N/a
1973–1974	All in the Family	CBS	20.65	Unknown	—N/a	—N/a	—N/a	—N/a	—N/a	—N/a
1974–1975	All in the Family	CBS	20.69	Unknown	—N/a	—N/a	—N/a	—N/a	—N/a	—N/a
1975–1976	All in the Family	CBS	20.95	Unknown	—N/a	—N/a	—N/a	—N/a	—N/a	—N/a
1976–1977	Happy Days	ABC	22.43	Unknown	—N/a	—N/a	—N/a	—N/a	—N/a	—N/a
1977–1978	Laverne & Shirley	ABC	23.04	Unknown	—N/a	—N/a	—N/a	—N/a	—N/a	—N/a
1978–1979	Laverne & Shirley	ABC	22.72	Unknown	—N/a	—N/a	—N/a	—N/a	—N/a	—N/a
1979–1980	60 Minutes	CBS	21.67	Unknown	—N/a	—N/a	—N/a	—N/a	—N/a	—N/a
1980s
1980–1981	Dallas	CBS	27.57	Unknown	—N/a	—N/a	—N/a	—N/a	—N/a	—N/a
1981–1982	Dallas	CBS	23.15	Unknown	—N/a	—N/a	—N/a	—N/a	—N/a	—N/a
1982–1983	60 Minutes	CBS	21.24	Unknown	—N/a	—N/a	—N/a	—N/a	—N/a	—N/a
1983–1984	Dallas	CBS	21.54	Unknown	—N/a	—N/a	—N/a	—N/a	—N/a	—N/a
1984–1985	Dynasty	ABC	21.23	Unknown	—N/a	—N/a	—N/a	—N/a	—N/a	—N/a
1985–1986	The Cosby Show	NBC	28.95	Unknown	—N/a	—N/a	—N/a	—N/a	—N/a	—N/a
1986–1987	The Cosby Show	NBC	30.50	Unknown	—N/a	—N/a	—N/a	—N/a	—N/a	—N/a
1987–1988	The Cosby Show	NBC	Unknown	Unknown	—N/a	—N/a	—N/a	—N/a	—N/a	—N/a
1988–1989	The Cosby Show	NBC	23.14	Unknown	—N/a	—N/a	—N/a	—N/a	—N/a	—N/a
1989–1990	The Cosby Show	NBC	21.28	Unknown	—N/a	—N/a	—N/a	—N/a	—N/a	—N/a
1989–1990	Roseanne	ABC	21.28	Unknown	—N/a	—N/a	—N/a	—N/a	—N/a	—N/a
1990s
1990–1991	Cheers	NBC	19.83	Unknown	—N/a	—N/a	—N/a	—N/a	—N/a	—N/a
1991–1992	60 Minutes	CBS	20.17	Unknown	—N/a	—N/a	—N/a	—N/a	—N/a	—N/a
1992–1993	60 Minutes	CBS	20.39	Unknown	—N/a	—N/a	—N/a	—N/a	—N/a	—N/a
1993–1994	60 Minutes	CBS	19.69	Unknown	—N/a	—N/a	—N/a	—N/a	—N/a	—N/a
1994–1995	Seinfeld	NBC	19.65	Unknown	—N/a	—N/a	—N/a	—N/a	—N/a	—N/a
1995–1996	ER	NBC	21.10	Unknown	—N/a	—N/a	—N/a	—N/a	—N/a	—N/a
1996–1997	ER	NBC	20.56	30.79	—N/a	—N/a	—N/a	—N/a	—N/a	—N/a
1997–1998	Seinfeld	NBC	21.27	34.10	—N/a	—N/a	—N/a	—N/a	—N/a	—N/a
1998–1999	ER	NBC	17.69	25.40	—N/a	—N/a	—N/a	—N/a	—N/a	—N/a
1999–2000	Who Wants to Be a Millionaire (Tues)	ABC	Unknown	28.53	—N/a	—N/a	—N/a	—N/a	—N/a	—N/a
2000s
2000–2001	Survivor	CBS	Unknown	29.80	—N/a	—N/a	—N/a	—N/a	—N/a	—N/a
2001–2002	Friends	NBC	Unknown	24.50	—N/a	—N/a	—N/a	—N/a	—N/a	—N/a
2002–2003	CSI: Crime Scene Investigation	CBS	Unknown	26.12	—N/a	—N/a	—N/a	—N/a	—N/a	—N/a
2003–2004	American Idol (Tues)	Fox	Unknown	25.73	—N/a	—N/a	—N/a	—N/a	—N/a	—N/a
2004–2005	American Idol (Tues)	Fox	Unknown	27.32	—N/a	—N/a	—N/a	—N/a	—N/a	—N/a
2005–2006	American Idol (Tues)	Fox	Unknown	31.17	—N/a	—N/a	—N/a	—N/a	—N/a	—N/a
2006–2007	American Idol (Wed)	Fox	Unknown	30.58	—N/a	—N/a	—N/a	—N/a	—N/a	—N/a
2007–2008	American Idol (Tues)	Fox	Unknown	28.80	—N/a	—N/a	—N/a	—N/a	—N/a	—N/a
2008–2009	American Idol (Wed)	Fox	Unknown	25.53	—N/a	—N/a	—N/a	American Idol (Wed)	Fox	26.88
2009–2010	American Idol (Tues)	Fox	Unknown	22.97	—N/a	—N/a	—N/a	American Idol (Tues)	Fox	24.71
2010s
2010–2011	American Idol (Wed)	Fox	Unknown	23.95	—N/a	—N/a	—N/a	American Idol (Wed)	Fox	26.20
2011–2012	NBC Sunday Night Football	NBC	Unknown	Unknown	—N/a	—N/a	—N/a	NBC Sunday Night Football	NBC	20.74
2012–2013	NBC Sunday Night Football	NBC	Unknown	Unknown	—N/a	—N/a	—N/a	NCIS (Note: In 2012–13, NBC Sunday Night Football aired three broadcasts – NFL week 1, NFL week 2 and the Kickoff Game – before the official start of the television season. These broadcasts are not counted in the rankings for Live nor Live + 7 DVR results. NBC Sunday Night Football still recorded the highest Live results for the season. For the Live + 7 DVR results, if these broadcasts were counted, NBC Sunday Night Football would average 21.44 million viewers, and would have displaced NCIS's 2012–13 / season 10 for the highest Live + 7 DVR results. The NFL Thanksgiving Game is counted as part of Sunday Night Football for ratings, but not the Kickoff Game or Weeks 1-2.)	CBS	21.34
2013–2014	NBC Sunday Night Football	NBC	Unknown	21.42	—N/a	—N/a	—N/a	The Big Bang Theory	CBS	23.10
2014–2015	NBC Sunday Night Football	NBC	Unknown	20.69	—N/a	—N/a	—N/a	NBC Sunday Night Football	NBC	20.81
2015–2016	NBC Sunday Night Football	NBC	Unknown	21.30	NBC Sunday Night Football	NBC	21.38	NBC Sunday Night Football	NBC	21.39
2016–2017	NBC Sunday Night Football	NBC	Unknown	19.63	NBC Sunday Night Football	NBC	19.73	NBC Sunday Night Football	NBC	19.75
2017–2018	NBC Sunday Night Football	NBC	Unknown	17.58	Roseanne	ABC	18.21	Roseanne	ABC	19.96
2018–2019	NBC Sunday Night Football	NBC	Unknown	18.80	NBC Sunday Night Football	NBC	18.92	NBC Sunday Night Football	NBC	18.94
2019–2020	NBC Sunday Night Football	NBC	Unknown	19.96	—N/a	—N/a	—N/a	NBC Sunday Night Football	NBC	20.09
2020s
2020–2021	—N/a	—N/a	—N/a	—N/a	—N/a	—N/a	—N/a	NBC Sunday Night Football	NBC	16.50
2021–2022	—N/a	—N/a	—N/a	—N/a	—N/a	—N/a	—N/a	NBC Sunday Night Football	NBC	18.00
2022–2023	—N/a	—N/a	—N/a	—N/a	—N/a	—N/a	—N/a	NBC Sunday Night Football	NBC	18.14

=== Television network ratings by year ===
(Average primetime viewership)

Network	2019 views	2018 views	2017 views	2016 views	2015 views	2014 views
CBS	7,140,000	7,385,000	7,996,000	8,814,000	9,419,000	9,375,000
NBC	6,330,000	7,876,000	7,284,000	8,426,000	7,757,000	8,264,000
ABC	5,192,000	5,423,000	5,592,000	6,325,000	6,894,000	6,838,000
Fox	4,623,000	4,401,000	4,733,000	5,053,000	5,198,000	5,973,000

== Nielsen SVOD content ratings ==
Starting in September 2020, Nielsen releases a weekly list of top 10 television shows most watched on streaming platforms, or subscription video on demand (SVOD). This immediately attracted attention by mainstream media, such as Variety, Hollywood Reporter, Deadline and Business Insider.

== See also ==
- AGB Nielsen Media Research Philippines
- C. E. Hooper
- Comscore
- Crossley ratings
- List of most watched television broadcasts in the United States
- List of most watched television broadcasts
- Media Market or Designated Market Area (DMA)
- Nielsen Audio
- Top-rated United States television programs by season
- VideoAmp
- Wikipedia:List of U.S. television ratings archives
