= Single source (disambiguation) =

To single source is to allow the same content to be used in different documents or in various formats.

Single source may also refer to:

- Single source data, the electronic measurement of television exposure and purchase behavior for a single household
- Single-source shortest path problem, a polynomial-time problem
