= Desensitized =

Desensitized may refer to:

- Desensitized (Pitchshifter album), 1993
- Desensitized (Drowning Pool album), 2004
- "Desensitized", a song by Green Day from Shenanigans
- "Desensitized", a song by The Mighty Mighty Bosstones from Let's Face It
- Desensitized, an album by Darker Half, 2011

== See also ==
- Desensitization (disambiguation)
