= Asia-Pacific Telecommunity band plan =

Telecom band plan for LTE development

The Asia-Pacific Telecommunity (APT) band plan is a type of segmentation of the 612–806 MHz band (usually referred to as the 600 MHz & 700 MHz bands) formalized by the APT in 2022–2023 and 2008-2010 respectively and specially configured for the deployment of mobile broadband technologies (e.g. most notably Long Term Evolution, LTE). This segmentation exists in two variants, FDD and TDD, that have been standardized by the 3rd Generation Partnership Project (3GPP) and recommended by the International Telecommunication Union (ITU) as segmentations A5 and A6, respectively. The APT band plan has been designed to enable the most efficient use of available spectrum. Therefore, this plan divides the band into contiguous blocks of frequencies that are as large as possible taking account of the need to avoid interference with services in other frequency bands. As the result, the TDD option (segmentation A6) includes 100 MHz of continuous spectrum, while the FDD option (segmentation A5) comprises two large blocks, one of 45 MHz for uplink transmission (mobile to network) in the lower part of the band and the other also of 45 MHz for downlink transmission in the upper part. As defined in the standard, both FDD and TDD schemes for the 700 MHz band include guard bands of 5 MHz and 3 MHz at their lower and upper edges, respectively. The FDD version also includes a centre gap of 10 MHz. The guard bands serve the purpose of mitigating interference with adjacent bands while the FDD centre gap is required to avoid interference between uplink and downlink transmissions. The two arrangements are shown graphically in figures 1 and 2.

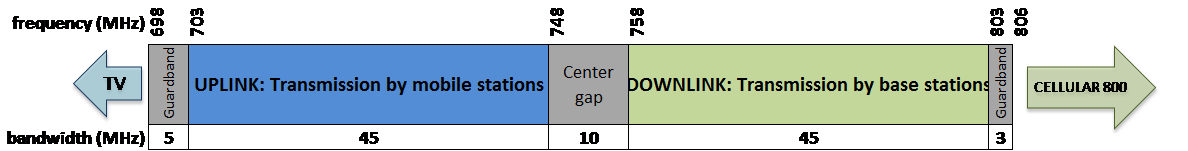
Figure 1. Harmonized FDD Arrangement of the APT band plan of the 700 MHz band

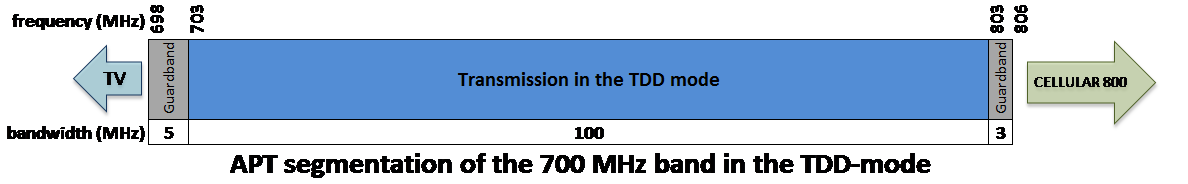
Figure 2. Harmonized TDD Arrangement of the APT band plan of the 700 MHz band

Existing 3GPP standards for the APT band plan are given below:

3GPP LTE band	3GPP NR band	Duplex	Uplink Frequency	Downlink frequency
28	n28	FDD	703–748 MHz	758–803 MHz
44	-	TDD	703–803 MHz	703–803 MHz
-	n105	FDD	663–703 MHz	612–652 MHz

Table 1. 3GPP standard bands for the APT segmentation of the 600 and 700 MHz bands

Allocation of the 700 MHz band (that in many parts of the world is commonly referred to as the Digital Dividend) to mobile communications it is one of the key solutions for meeting the mobile data explosion challenge faced by the telecommunications industry and telecommunications regulators seeking additional spectrum for the deployment of new mobile broadband networks and capacity. As of today, the APT band plan is considered to be the most effective way to segment the 700 MHz band from the point of view of modern spectrum management. The superior spectral efficiency of this plan is explained further in this article. Currently, the FDD configuration is the one which has been studied most widely and is much more popular across the world. For this reason, the FDD APT band plan option is generally referred to as the APT band plan.

== History ==
Milestones of the development of the 700 MHz band	Market facts
August 1997 – FCC, the U.S. telecom regulator, proposes a rulemaking in order to allocate frequencies in the upper 700 MHz for dedicated use by public safety agencies of the USA. The rest of the 700 MHz band is set to be attributed to International Mobile Telecommunications International Mobile Telecommunications (IMT). With this, FCC demonstrates its leadership and vision in spectrum management as early as a decade before the APT band plan is created and long before the appearance of mobile data growth phenomenon. However, as a result, the US band plan is shaped in a highly complex and fragmented way.	1997 – The international public telecommunications numbering plan is published in Recommendation E.164 by the ITU 1998 - Sprint Corporation announces that it will offer an advanced packet-switching network to simultaneously send voice, data, and video down a single phone line, for the first time in history.
September 2000, February 2001, April 2002, August 2002, May 2003, July 2005 – In USA, during Auctions 31, 33, 38, 44, 49, and 60, respectively, guardbands and a few spectrum blocks are auctioned in both upper and lower 700 MHz bands. The frequencies are arranged in a way that the 700 MHz band is broken into small spectrum blocks of 6 MHz wide each.	1999 – For the first time in the world, internet service on mobile phones is introduced by a Japanese company called NTT DoCoMo 2000 – ITU reports 400 mln internet users in the world 2001 – Wikipedia goes online and rapidly gains popularity 2001 – The first commercial 3G network using the WCDMA technology is launched in Japan by NTT DoCoMo 2002 – Research in Motion (RIM) releases its first Blackberry smartphone 2003 – EDGE technology (also referred to as 2.75G) is deployed for the first time in the US by Cingular (now – AT&T) permitting data transmission with a theoretical maximum bitrate of 384 kbit/s 2005 - Nokia announces the Nokia 770 Internet Tablet, the first tablet to appear on the market
October 2007 – The decision to allocate the 700 MHz band to IMT is taken at the World Radio Conference in 2007 (WRC-07) by the ITU-R.	2006 – First 4G WiMAX network is deployed commercially in South Korea by KT Corp. 2007 – 3G networks worldwide reach 295 million subscribers (9% of the total worldwide subscriber base) 2007 – Apple Inc. announces the iPhone, a product that is designed to unleash the potential of mobile internet
March 2008 – The FCC auctions off A, B, C, and E block licenses in the 700 MHz band raising around US$19 billion. As a result, the biggest share of the spectrum goes to Verizon Wireless and the next biggest to AT&T. These auctions and the spectrum ownership they granted represent one of the most important steps in the definition of the ecosystem of the US band plan.	2008 – Apple Inc. releases iPhone 3G that supports 3G networks and boosts mobile data consumption by users
September 2009 – Shortly after the WRC-07, based on inputs from numerous stakeholders and having taken into account foreseen developments of telecommunications industry, the Spectrum Working Group of the APT elaborates the original version of the APT band plan in the 700 MHz band in their release of the Report 11 (“APT report on UHF band usage and considerations for realizing the UHF Digital Dividend”, No. APT/AWF/REP-11, Edition: September 2009, Adopted by the 7th APT Wireless Forum Meeting on 23 – 26 September 2009 in Phuket, Thailand).	2009 – First 4G LTE network is deployed commercially in Scandinavia by TeliaSonera
March 2010 - During the 8th meeting of the APT Wireless Forum (AWF-8), held in Tokyo, Japan from 29 March to 1 April 2010, the consensus is reached on the basic structure of harmonized segmentation of the 698-806 MHz band and the Spectrum Working Group of the APT initiates the study of the UHF Digital Dividend in order to develop frequency arrangements leading to a widely accepted harmonized band plan for the 700 MHz band. In September 2010, APT releases its final harmonized frequency arrangements for the 700 MHz band (“APT report on harmonized frequency arrangements for the band 698-806 MHz”, No. APT/AWF/REP-14, adopted by the 9th APT Wireless Forum Meeting on 13 – 16 September 2010 in Seoul, Republic of Korea).	April 2010 – Apple Inc. releases iPad, a tablet computer that supports data transmission over 3G networks June 2010 - Sprint Nextel releases the first WiMAX smartphone in the US, the HTC Evo 4G November 2010 - Samsung Galaxy Craft offered by MetroPCS is the first commercially available LTE smartphone
September 2011 - The Spectrum Working group releases the second report focusing on the APT band plan where a number of in-depth studies on mobile user equipment and out-of-band emission levels are presented (“APT Report on Implementation Issues Associated With Use of the Band 698-806 MHz by Mobile Services”, No. APT/AWG/REP-24, Edition: September 2011, Adopted by the 11th APT Wireless Group Meeting on 14 – 17 September 2011 in Chiang Mai, Thailand). In December 2011, the Inter-American Telecommunication Commission (CITEL) adopts a new recommendation: PCC.II/REC.30 (XVIII-11) “Frequency arrangements in the 698-806 MHz band in the Americas for the mobile broadband services” which includes the FDD APT band plan as another option of segmentation of the 700 MHz band for Americas Region, besides the US band plan. (XVIII Meeting of Permanent Consultative Committee II: Radiocommunications including Broadcasting (PCC.II), November 28 to December 2, San Juan, Puerto Rico)	2011 - With 5.9 billion mobile-cellular subscriptions, global mobile penetration reaches 87%. 2011 - Mobile-broadband subscriptions grow 45% annually (since 2007) and reach the figure of almost 1.2 billion. By the end of the year, there are twice as many mobile broadband as fixed broadband subscriptions 2011 - Worldwide 3G coverage reaches 45% of the population
January 2012 – Before and during the World Radio Conference 2012, the APT band plan gains momentum resulting in a number of Latin American countries announcing publicly their preference of this segmentation of the 700 MHz band plan in the following months. In March 2012, the Radio Communications Bureau of the ITU (ITU-R) releases Recommendation ITU-R M.1036-4 (03/2012) “Frequency arrangements for implementation of the terrestrial component of International Mobile Telecommunications (IMT) in the bands identified for IMT in the Radio Regulations (RR)” (Rec. ITU-R M.1036); which includes for 698-960 MHz band the frequency arrangement equivalent to FDD APT band plan identified as “A5”. In October 2012, during XX CITEL's PCC.II meeting in Mexico City, followed by the 2nd Latin American Spectrum Conference, organized by Mexican telecommunications regulator (COFETEL), a number of countries of Latin America highlight their strong preference towards the APT band plan, including Brazil, Uruguay, Paraguay, Peru and Ecuador, among others.	November 2012 – Apple Inc. releases the new iPad 4 that supports various LTE networks across the globe July 2012 - approximately 10.5% of all Web traffic occurs through mobile devices (up from 4% in December 2010) September 2012 – Apple releases iPhone 5 that supports LTE networks in the 700 MHz band (only according to the US band plan). Equipped with a frontal HD camera, iPhone again sets expectations for increasingly higher mobile data consumption.

Table 2. Milestones of the development of the 700 MHz band

== Worldwide regulation status for the APT band plan by country ==
Country	Current state
Australia	Australia auctioned off part of the 700 MHz spectrum according to the APT band plan together with the 2.5 GHz band.
Argentina	Argentina's position was publicly announced at the XVIII CITEL's PCC.II meeting in November 2011. Through its proposal, the country added the APT segmentation option for the band 698-806 MHz in accordance with ITU-R M.1036-4 (03/2012).
Brazil	On February 6, 2013, Brazil published the guidelines for accelerate access to the Digital Television and the expansion of spectrum availability for meeting the objectives of the Brazilian National Broadband Program in the Official Gazette. One of the proposals is to consider regional and international harmonization in order to adopt a frequency arrangement that favors coexistence in border regions and the exploitation of economies of scale, the APT bandplan.
Chile	In May 2016, SUBTEL, Chile's telecoms regulator, announced nationwide deployment using the 700 MHz band for LTE and authorized telecoms to start offering the service.
China	China plans to adopt the TDD version of the APT bandplan. However, in 2022, China Broadnet Mobile was awarded 703-733/758-788MHz FDD (N28A) spectrum. China Broadnet Mobile is building a 5G network (N28A, N41, N79) in conjunction with China Mobile.
Colombia	In May 2012, Colombia announced its adoption of the APT band plan. Colombia is expected to carry out the first tests in Latin America for a LTE network on the 700 MHz band with APT channeling supported by Huawei, ZTE and Ericsson. The first tests were to take place during 1Q 2013.
Costa Rica	In March 2012, SUTEL, Costa Rican regulator became the first regulator in Latin America to issue a recommendation in favor of the APT band plan on 29 March where it mentioned the efforts aimed to reach regional harmonization in the 700 MHz band: ”…Among the efforts to concretize this harmonization of spectrum, is the initiative of the Federal Telecommunications Commission (COFETEL), the entity that, through a series of dialogues with governments of Latin America, has discovered that there exists a great geographic consensus on the way to utilize the spectrum in the 698-806 MHz band that permits to maximize the social impact of networks in this band.”
Ecuador	In October 2012, Ecuador announced the adoption of the APT band plan at the week of the XX CITEL's PCC.II meeting in Mexico City.
Japan	In June 2012, Japan's Ministry of Internal Affairs Communications awarded rights to the use of 700-MHz spectrum to NTT DoCoMo, KDDI, SoftBank and e-Mobile in accordance with APT FDD band plan.
India	In April 2012, the country has introduced the National Frequency Allocation plan where it sets the 700 MHz band to be used for IMT. TRAI, the country's telecom regulator, has proposed to adopt the APT bandplan and to auction the frequencies already in 2013. March 2013 – TRAI announced the adoption of APT700 FDD band plan and clearly stated that the reason for preferring it over the US band plan was more efficient use of spectrum. In 2022, India auctioned the APT 600 MHz band being the first country in the world to do so.
Hong Kong	In November 2021, Office of the Communications Authority auctioned off part of the 700 MHz spectrum (703-738MHz Paired with 758-793 MHz) after PAL analogue TV ceased broadcasting on 30 November 2020
Mexico	In September 2012, The Federal Commission of Telecommunications in Mexico (COFETEL) announced the adoption of the APT band plan for the 700 MHz band. This decision became one of the few decisions in the area of telecommunications where Mexico adopts a competing model with the USA. It was taken despite the necessity for additional coordination along the common US-Mexico border of around 3000 km.
New Zealand	New Zealand adopted the full FDD APT band plan and auctioned the spectrum in October 2013. Vodafone deployed the first 4G services on 700 MHz in New Zealand in July 2014
Panama	In October 2012, Panama adopted APT band plan one week before the XX CITEL's PCC.II meeting in Mexico City.
Papua New Guinea	Papua New Guinea adopted the APT FDD 2 x 45 MHz band plan.
Philippines	The Philippine government with a small part and the duopoly, SMART Communications and Globe Telecom, acquired the coveted 700 MHz spectrum when San Miguel Corporation sold its telecom business.
Saudi Arabia	Saudi Arabia CST set aside 703-733/758-788MHz aside for mobile spectrum. In November 2024, Mobily acquires 20MHz (703-723/758-778MHz) spectrum license for 15 years.
South Korea	South Korea allocated 2 x 20 MHz in accordance with the APT FDD band plan; usage of remaining spectrum officially has not yet been decided. Analog switch off is set to be completed by the end of 2012.
Taiwan	In October 2012, the National Communications Commission in Taiwan announced that they adopted the Asia Pacific Telecommunity (APT) band plan for the 700 MHz band for mobile services. Auctions dates are set for August 2013 and the spectrum will be auctioned off in 4 blocks - three blocks of 10x2 MHz and one block of 15x2 MHz.
Tonga	Tonga adopted the APT FDD 2 x 45 MHz band plan.
Trinidad and Tobago	In November 2017, the Telecommunications Authority of Trinidad and Tobago (TATT) adopted the APT FDD 700 MHz band plan (i.e. LTE Band 28). 2 x 10 MHz of spectrum was allocated to PPDR, 2 x 30 MHz (2 x 10 MHz each) was allocated for the provision of public mobile telecommunication services (for 3 mobile operators) and 2 x 5 MHz was allocated for future use. In October 2020, Digicel and bmobile both received their licenses in the 700 MHz band.
United Arab Emirates	United Arab Emirates adopted the APT band plan in May 2013. UAE is adopting the 2 x 30 MHz channel plan for the 700 MHz band as a baseline, consisting of 703–733 MHz (uplink) paired with 758 – 788 MHz (downlink). The regulator has committed to vacate this band by end of 2013 for IMT utilization.

Table 3. Worldwide regulation status for the APT band plan by country

== Advantages ==
=== General ===
The APT band plan has been developed over a 2.5 year period and was based on considerable technical studies by industry and governments. The successful creation of the harmonized band plan was facilitated by a high degree of cooperation among industry stakeholders (governments, vendors, operators, associations, and others). As a result, the APT band plan has the capacity to meet modern and future requirements by networks, user equipment and growing demand of connectivity.

=== Economic ===
==== Potential for economies of scale ====
Because many countries across the globe have adopted the APT band plan, substantial economies of scale are bound to be created. That will lead to personal devices' and network elements' price erosion and thus, also to increasingly higher penetration of mobile devices and mobile internet.

==== Room for more competition ====
The APT band plan allows that up to 4 operators could receive wide spectrum blocks (2x 10 MHz in this case), or 3 operators getting 2x 15 MHz each, or other mixed configurations. On the other hand, in the US, there are only three commercial operators using the band, with two operators (AT&T and Verizon Wireless), each having 2x 10 MHz of spectrum and T-Mobile having 2x 5 Mhz of spectrum.

==== Potentially, the most harmonized band in the world ====
The APT band plan has already become a multi-regionally harmonized spectrum band that will provide a coherent ecosystem for LTE devices. Most Asian countries have already opted for the APT band; there is a strong evidence of a rising regional consensus among the vast majority of Latin American countries. Europe's "second" digital dividend matches the second duplexer of the APT band plan which implies that the user equipment, as well as network elements will be compatible with those of the APT band plan. Additionally, some Middle East and African countries have already shown their preference of the APT band plan. Countries in the Caribbean such as Cuba, Dominican Republic and Trinidad and Tobago have also adopted the APT band plan.

==== Spectrum planning flexibility ====
The APT band plan allows greater national spectrum planning flexibility for governments all over the world, giving the possibility to adjust channel sizes to necessities of particular market and country by allocating blocks ranging from 2x 5 MHz up to 2x 20 MHz.

=== Technical ===
==== Full interoperability ====
With the inclusion of two-duplexer system in the devices and network equipment, full interoperability is guaranteed across the entire band of the APT band plan. In a nutshell, it means that any user will be able to use his/her mobile device in any network in the 700 MHz band where the APT band plan is used, regardless of the mobile operator and the country. On the contrary, in the US band plan, there are two or three different device ecosystems which translate to non-interoperability within the country, and severe limitations (most probably, practically unavailability) of international roaming.

==== Wide channel size ====
The APT band plan represents two blocks of 45 MHz of contiguous spectrum. This enables operators to enjoy much wider channels comparing to the blocks available within the US band plan. That translates to much greater efficiency of networks, higher data throughput levels, lower latency and less investments needed for network deployment, all other factors being equal. Wider channel sizes are crucially important for the networks of the nearest future because of the growth of mobile data and projected capacity demand.

==== Strong protective measures against interference ====
The APT band plan assures appropriate protective measures for other services in adjacent bands which allow avoiding harmful interference from TV services in lower bands as well as from cellular networks in upper bands. In the same manner, the center gap of 10 MHz protects the band from self-interference.

==== Adaptiveness to future technological demands ====
In the near future, the phenomenon of asymmetric traffic (when downlink experiences more traffic than uplink) can be mitigated by applying signal processing techniques that are currently under consideration in the standards development process for the APT band plan. Examples of such techniques are: skewing the number of MIMO antennas to the side where higher traffic is needed, Multi-user MIMO, and other methods.

== Challenges ==
=== “Competition” with the US band plan ===
US band plan was developed significantly earlier than the APT band plan. As of today, there are successful deployments of LTE networks in the USA. Due to this fact, the ecosystem of this band plan is relatively well-developed with two large networks already operating commercially and with a number of user devices existing on the market. The APT band plan does not yet enjoy a ready ecosystem and, therefore, has to “compete” with the US band plan in order to become the preferred way for countries to segment the band.

=== The ecosystem of devices and network elements is yet to be developed ===
Another existing challenge is the advancement of its own ecosystem, which in turn depends on equipment vendors: terminal devices manufacturers (HTC, Apple, Samsung, Nokia, etc.), producers of parts of terminals (such as Qualcomm) and vendors that manufacture network elements (Ericsson, Nokia Siemens Networks, Alcatel-Lucent, Huawei, etc.). The development of the ecosystem depends heavily on the demand that exists on the market and is a function of the created economies of scale.

=== China’s intention to use the TDD configuration of the APT band plan ===
Most likely, China will follow the TDD configuration of the APT band plan, thus most probably becoming one of a handful of markets in the world that support such configuration, but still an important and large one. Even Taiwan, one of China's closest neighbors, adopted the FDD version of the APT band plan. Furthermore, TDD configuration is technologically in many ways inferior to the FDD one. (It should be said, however, that in a number cases the TDD configuration proves to have certain advantages, such as larger capacity to bear with downlink disproportionately exceeding the uplink data transmission). In the same time, the TDD configuration of the 700 MHz, as it is seen today, is not expected to form part of the same ecosystem as the FDD mode either of the APT band plan, or of the US band plan. Therefore, it will not add up to economies of scale of neither of the two and a completely separate ecosystem might likely be developed.

=== Two duplexers issue ===
In the APT 700 FDD configuration, two overlapping duplexers are required to cover the entire band due to the limitations by current filter technologies. The existence of two duplexers in the APT band plan and the fact that European, Japanese (and perhaps some other future networks) will only work with one duplexer set, raise a question of whether user and network equipment manufacturers will incorporate both duplexers in their equipment or will create two parallel configurations – one with only one duplexer and another one with both of them. Presence of both configurations would lead to less significant economies of scale for each type of the equipment and to distortions in the economic valuation of different parts of the spectrum in the 700 MHz band. Although the dynamics of the market such as the ever-increasing complexity of chipsets, multi-band support by chip manufacturers demonstrate that the most likely outcome is the inclusion of both duplexers in all devices. Additionally, whereas channel bandwidths up to 15 MHz can be supported anywhere within the band, channel bandwidths of 20 MHz are limited to the upper and lower parts of the band and may not be employed in the mid-portion of the band where the filters overlap.

As of 2014, most equipment vendors have released two versions of their radio units: one dedicated to the lower band and another one dedicated to the upper band. A notable alternative is provided by Alcatel-Lucent - their RRH2x40-07APT-4R radio unit covers the entire band 28 (45 MHz) within a single radio unit thus negating the need of sourcing two different radio unit variants.

== Ecosystem ==
=== Incompatibility with the US band plan ===
Frequency arrangements of the US band plan and the APT band plan substantially overlap thus making them largely incompatible. The 3GPP has designated five operating bands for the US band plan (Bands 12, 13, 14, 17, 29) and two bands for the APT band plan (Band 28 for FDD version and Band 44 for TDD version). There are distinct differences among the operating bands such as different channel bandwidths and channel locations within the 700 MHz band. More specifically, duplex spacing and guardband peculiarities of the APT band plan is what differentiates it most. US band plan, in its turn, is characterized by a number of inconsistencies: i) non-existence of in-band interoperability (i.e. devices working in band 13 are not compatible with devices working with in either of the bands 12, 14, 17); ii) harmful interference from TV channels; iii) absence of user equipment in Band 12 (it is also not likely to appear in the future)[EDIT 12/1/2014: Band 12 equipment is already available]; iv) no current use of the D and E blocks in the lower part of the 700 MHz band (there is a 12 MHz TDD frequency block); and some other issues. As a result of these peculiarities of segmentation, block A of the lower 700 MHz band is practically not used due to interference from TV Channel 51. Out of the total of 23x2 MHz of spectrum owned and used by AT&T and Verizon, 3x2 MHz cannot be used due to limitations by LTE technology standards - only blocks of 5, 10 MHz can be used according to 3GPP industry standards.

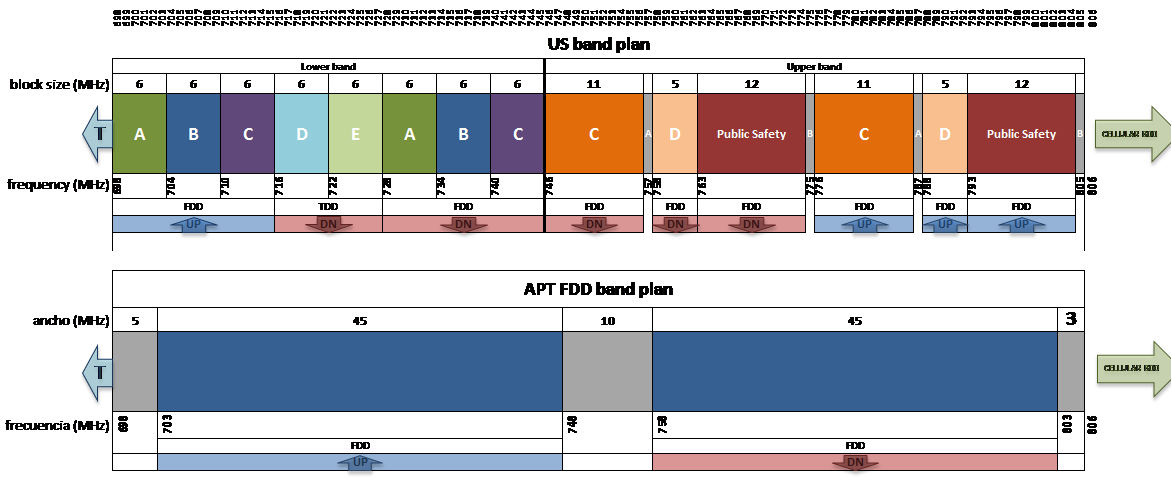
Figure 3. Incompatibility of the US band plan and the APT band plan in the 700 MHz band

=== Compatibility of the APT band plan with the foreseen usage of the 700 MHz band in different regions of the world ===
European countries, which still continue have a high occupancy of broadcasting services in the 700 MHz band that have been granted a period until 2015 to convert to digital. It appears that since the APT segmentation is based on two overlapping duplexers of 30+30 MHz, it fits perfectly in the European scheme, as shown on the graph below. This compatibility opens the way for the harmonization of the 700 MHz band with the European region. Japan, one of largest and most advanced Asian markets and the global technology leader is using the upper duplexer part of the APT band plan and thus will enjoy being the part of the ecosystem of the APT band plan too. This basically means that the terminals designed to work in the APT band plan will perfectly function in Europe and Japan, thus adding up to the size of the market that is being created by the APT band plan. All facts mentioned above and the recent announcements from various governments indicate that the 700 MHz band in the FDD mode of the APT band plan is becoming one of the most harmonized band that exists in the world. This extent of harmonization will lead to economies of scale which will in turn drag down the prices of terminals, speed up adoption of smart devices and finally convert to socio-economic benefits.

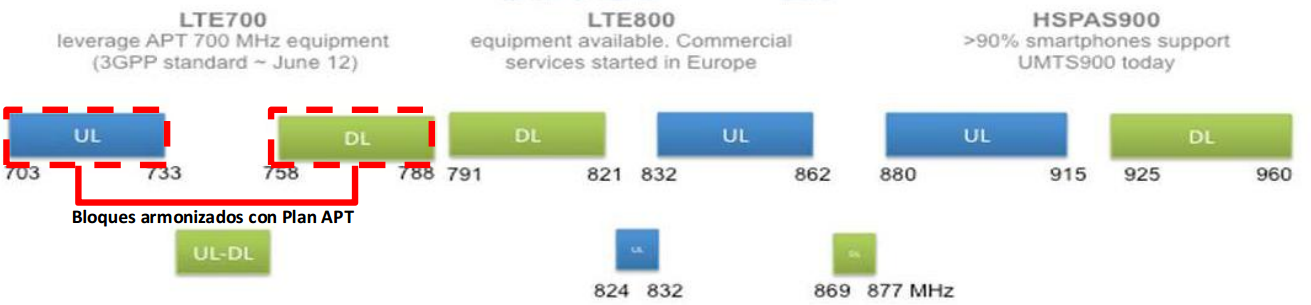
Figure 4. Scheme of possible harmonization of sub 1 GHz bands

=== User equipment ===
At the given moment, the user equipment (UE) for this segmentation scheme has not yet been released commercially. In the same time, the development of 3GPP and ITU standards (bands 28 and 44) and evident signals that has been sent to the market by many countries in Asia, Latin America and elsewhere, indicate that technological developments of the required ecosystem (first of all, in terms of user equipment and network equipment) are currently underway. Some of the strongest signals for the future demand have been sent by large markets, such as Japan, India, Indonesia, and above all, Mexico. This country was the first large market in Americas to adopt the APT band plan despite historical path dependency and despite having a 3,000 km border with the USA which uses a different segmentation of the 700 MHz band. Another point that is worth to mention is that the standardization work that has been carried out by the 3GPP was strongly supported by many key companies from the industry. That also proves that the equipment manufacturers are in the process of the commercialization of UE and network elements driven by the creation of significant market by the APT band plan. All that seems to indicate that first prototypes of APT devices will appear in the Q2 of 2013 and market releases are to be expected in the second half of 2013. In Latin America, for example, the National Spectrum Agency (ANE) of Colombia has announced that Huawei, ZTE and Ericsson will conduct tests in the band under the standard APT pipeline in the first quarter of 2013, using equipment developed by the leading manufacturers with the goal to auction off the spectrum in August 2013. Due to economies of scale that are being created by the APT band plan, the price of smart devices could then lower down significantly.

=== Current state and recent developments ===
A significant number of countries have already adopted the APT segmentation scheme: Australia, India, Japan, Korea, the Philippines, New Zealand, Papua New Guinea, Taiwan, and Tonga in Asia; and Brazil, Costa-Rica, Colombia, Chile, Mexico, Ecuador, Panama and Argentina in Latin America. In countries such as Indonesia, Singapore, Thailand, Vietnam, Uruguay, Paraguay, Peru and a few others it is scheduled to be adopted in the nearest future. In Europe, allocation of the 700 MHz band to mobile services implies challenges, acknowledged by the ITU-R in its decision that new allocations should not come into force until 2015 due to many countries in Europe having digital terrestrial television (DTT) services in 700 MHz band. That decision also takes into account the need for European countries to better study issues regarding the channel plan and to carry out compatibility studies regarding other services in the Region and on other topics, before taking final position on the best suitable allocation and associated regulation. However, once these issues are resolved, the APT band plan will become compatible with the usage of the 700 MHz band in Europe, whereas the US band plan will not.

=== Spectrum harmonization and potential economies of scale ===
Generally speaking, it is very important that the spectrum is used in the same way across as many markets as possible to create economies of scale. That, in turn, leads to lower prices for the equipment thus increasing the adoption of the technology and having a direct and indirect impact on the economic growth. This growth consists of enhancement of productivity, job creation, entrepreneurship, infrastructure investment, taxation; all leading to GDP growth. According to the joint study of the GSMA and the Boston Consulting Group, the biggest socio-economic benefits are likely to arise by allocating the 700 MHz band to mobile services.

For example, by 2020, the allocation of 700 MHz band in Asia to mobile could generate a GDP increase of more than US$1 trillion (NPV of $960 billion) and tax revenue growth of US$215 billion, along with the creation of an additional 1.4 million new businesses (including new departments or business units within existing firms) and 2.7 million new jobs. Comparing allocation to mobile services and broadcasting services, which is another possible option of utilization of the 700 MHz band, the first option would lead to significant incremental economic benefits over the broadcasting services – in particular, an extra US$959 billion in GDP, by 2020, as well as additional tax revenues of US$171 billion, 1.4 million more business activities, and 2.6 million additional jobs, according to the study.

Creation of economies of scale is vital for mass production of equipment and its further adoption in target markets. Overall, the greater economies of scale are, the lesser end user prices will be established and the vaster will be the adoption of the technology that translates to socio-economic benefits. Speaking about the ecosystem availability timeframes, many stakeholders expect the APT band plan ecosystem to develop rapidly as countries identify and auction spectrum with this frequency arrangement.

Although there exists a rather small spectral overlap that theoretically provides some opportunities for manufacturing equipment that would be operable across both plans, there are important technical considerations that are certain to constrain practical radio-frequency (RF) designs to separate markets for two band plans of the 700 MHz band.

With the ongoing adoption of the LTE technology, future numerous deployments in the 700 MHz band and the advancements in the microelectronics, the user devices of the future might support multiple LTE bands and potentially could even include RF designs (antennas, band chips, duplexers, filters, oscillators and other circuitry) supporting both the US band plan and the APT band plan. However, at least in the short- and medium-term, there will be separate markets for UE in these two existing band plan configurations.

As is it forecasted as of today, the US band plan will solely be used in the US, Canada, Nicaragua and a handful of Caribbean islands. That, by itself, represents a significant market of an order of 410 million people.

However, the recent developments around the propagation of the APT band plan across Asia-Pacific region, Latin America, and thanks to the compatibility of the European frequency arrangements, as well as the situation in Africa and Middle East, project confidence that a far bigger market is being created worldwide. Summed up, the prospective overall market for the APT band plan translates to a figure of at the very least 3 billion people across the globe. With ongoing studies of the digital dividend in the world, that number is might increase and include nearly all the rest of the world. First and foremost, vast number of Asian-Pacific countries have already adopted the APT band plan. For the moment, combined markets of Australia, Bangladesh, India, Indonesia, Japan, New Zealand, Pakistan, Papua New Guinea, Philippines, Singapore and South Korea add up to around 2 billion 100 million people. In the Middle East and Africa region, Egypt, Kenya, Nigeria, South Africa and United Arab Emirates are likely to follow Europe in using partially the frequency arrangement of the APT band plan which makes them fall into the same category of ecosystems. The number of such countries of the region is bound to rise. These countries alone represent a market equal to that of the US band plan – around 330 million people. In Latin America, Argentina, Brazil, Chile, Colombia, Ecuador, Mexico, Costa-Rica, Panama, Peru, Venezuela have all officially adopted the APT band plan while in the Caribbean, Trinidad and Tobago is the only country to have officially adopted the APT band plan. The logical outcome of the ongoing regional harmonization process in Americas will be the resulting market of an order of 400 million consumers. Given the size of the potential market that is on the verge of being created, the socio-economic benefits caused by booming access and adoption of the mobile internet by all social layers of population and driven by rocketing penetration of smart devices will be overwhelming and transformational.

== Technical characteristics and considerations ==
=== Existing standards for the APT band plan ===
The FDD mode of the APT 700 MHz band plan has been standardized by the 3GPP as the Band 28/n28 (FDD 703-748 / 758 - 803 MHz) and the TDD mode - as the Band 44 (TDD 703 – 803 MHz). The work for the LTE bands was completed at RAN4 #63 meeting in Czech Republic on May 21–25, 2012. The FDD mode of the APT 600 MHz band plan has been standardized by the 3GPP as the Band n105 (FDD 663-703 / 612 - 652 MHz)

3GPP LTE band	1.4 MHz	3 MHz	5 MHz	10 MHz	15 MHz	20 MHz
28	No	Yes	Yes	Yes	Yes	Yes (Note: Restrictions apply)
44	No	Yes	Yes	Yes	Yes	Yes

Table 4. Supported LTE channel bandwidths for APT segmentation of the 700 MHz band

3GPP NR band	5 MHz	10 MHz	15 MHz	20 MHz	25 MHz	30 MHz	35 MHz
n28	Yes	Yes	Yes	Yes	Yes	Yes	No
n105	Yes	Yes	Yes	Yes	Yes	Yes	Yes

Table 5. Supported NR channel bandwidths for APT segmentation of the 700 MHz and 600 MHz bands

The following table outlines the main technical aspects of the standard that have been set at the 3GPP RAN4 Plenary in Slovenia on 13-15 of June 2012 in the R4-123624 for the FDD mode and in the R4-123696 for the TDD mode.

Item	Value	Purpose
Out-of-band emission level across 694-698 MHz	26.2 dBm/6 MHz	To ensure no interference from television services in adjacent bands
Self-band protection	-32 dBm/MHz	To ensure intra-band protection of receiver and transmitter

Table 6. Technical aspects of the standard of APT segmentation of the 700 MHz band

3GPP members who supported and contributed to this work include: Alcatel-Lucent, CATT, China Mobile, Ericsson, ETRI, HiSilicon, Huawei, KDDI, KT Corporation, LG Electronics Inc., LG-Ericsson Co. Ltd., Motorola Mobility, NII Holdings, Nokia, Nokia Siemens Networks, NTT DOCOMO, Qualcomm Inc., Samsung, ST-Ericsson, Telefónica S.A., Vodafone, ZTE. The segmentation scheme called "A5" for the band 698-806 MHz, corresponding to the FDD mode of the APT band plan, is defined by the Recommendation of ITU-R M.1036-4 (3/2012) "Frequency Arrangements for Implementation of the terrestrial component of International Mobile Telecommunications (IMT) in the bands Identifies for IMT in the Radio Regulations (RR) "(ITU-R M.1036). The TDD version of the APT band plan is standardized as the “A6” segmentation scheme in accordance with the same Recommendation of ITU-R M.1036-4 (3/2012). Current specifications can be found in 3GPP TS 36.101 v11.1.0 for the UE and 3GPP TS 36.104 v11.1.0 for the Base Stations. They correspond to the frequency arrangement of the Rec. ITU-R M.1036-4 (3-2012).

=== Technology ===
The most favoured, popular mobile broadband technology internationally for the digital spectrum appears to be the FDD-LTE technology. LTE is known to offer operators and end users high data throughput and low latency which are the two main characteristics of a technology that is aimed to be used for data transmission. Peak speeds utilizing multiple antennas (MIMO) in optimal conditions are in excess of 300 Mbit/s. While actual speeds experienced by users will be dependent on equipment and the number of users connected to any cell, it is clear that LTE offers speeds which could result in a step-change in mobile broadband connectivity. The move to LTE is seen as the key next step for mobile network operators aiming to respond to the increasing demand for mobile data access. LTE offers greater spectral efficiency, allowing the provision of higher data speeds and greater data allowance, at lower cost. This will be particularly important for MNOs as average revenue per user from voice and text services falls. FDD-LTE offers a natural upgrade path from GSM and WCDMA technologies which are already widely implemented in New Zealand. It will be able to provide both mobile and fixed wireless broadband services. There is also growing interest from some manufacturers in using TDD-LTE in the 700 MHz band. This move is led mainly by equipment manufacturers and mobile network operators in China. At the current moment in time, though, the technology is largely untested.

=== Comparison of FDD and TDD modes of the APT band plan ===
According to the estimates of Qualcomm, “in a coverage-limited system comparison using the same frequency band, the TDD system required 31% more base stations than FDD when using a 1:1 TDD system and 65% more base stations when using a 2:1 TDD system. Higher frequency bands required even more base stations.” Due to the fact that the major part of both capital and operational expenditures of operators have to do with base stations of the network, making their incurred costs directly proportional to the number of base stations, FDD deployments imply lower deployment and operating costs.

=== Duplexers ===
The duplexer is a filter that provides isolation of the transmitter leakage to its own receiver. In a mobile connected device, the transmitter and receiver are linked to the same antenna by means of a duplexer. Duplexer isolation of > 45 dB is considered feasible by the industry. If the duplexer isolation is not sufficient then the handset may experience self-desensitization. Multi-mode, multi-band handsets often have mode- and band-specific duplexers. Duplexer technology affects choice of duplex separation and centre band gap which have been designed for the APT band plan with these considerations in mind.

=== Duplex Spacing ===
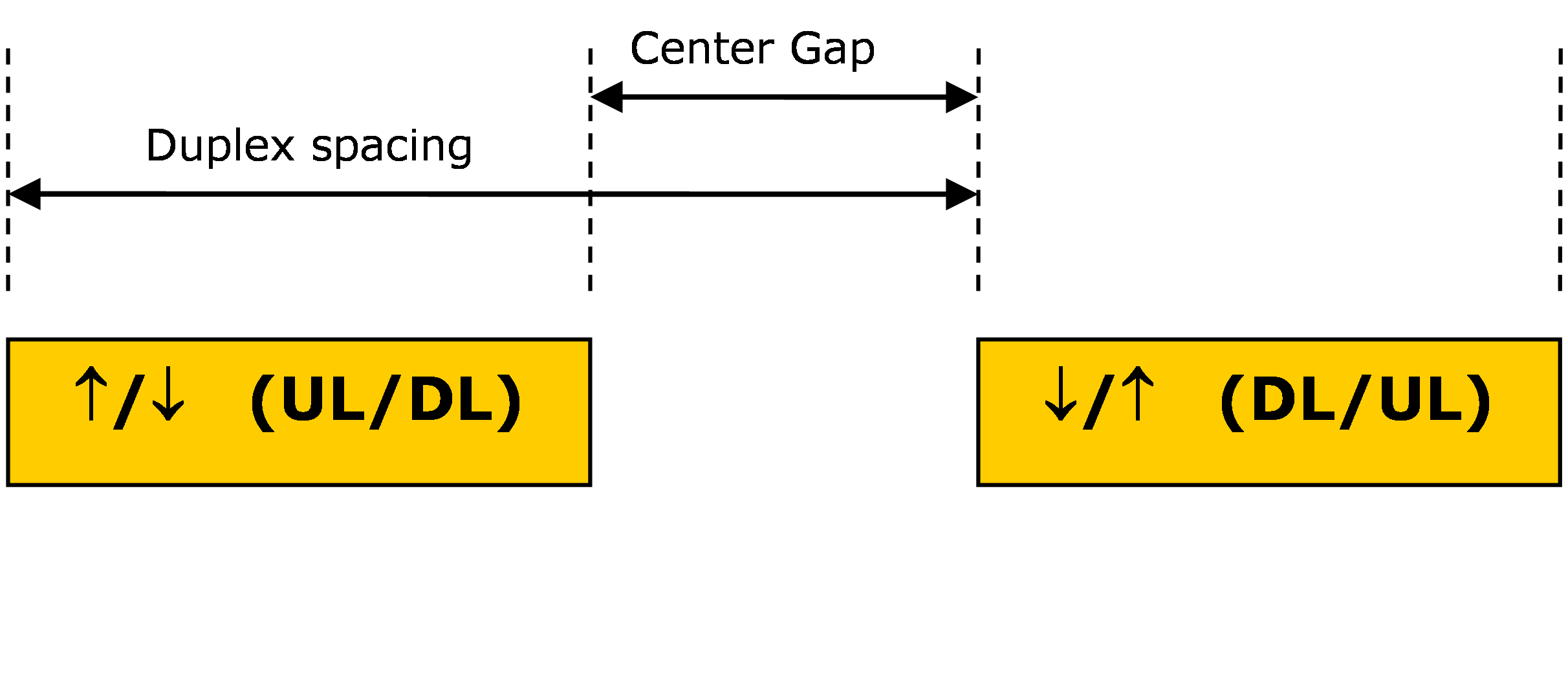
Figure 5. Duplexers in the FDD mode of the APT band plan

Duplex spacing is the separation between the uplink channel and the corresponding downlink channel. A larger separation implies less likelihood of self-interference between a handset transmitter and its own receiver. Because a power amplifier out of band response is related to the bandwidth, the duplex separation requirement is also dependent on the carrier bandwidth in order to protect the receiver from self-interference. A duplex spacing of 30 MHz is sufficient to support carrier bandwidths of up to 10 MHz. This result is derived using 3GPP specification 3GPP 36.101.

=== Centre Gap ===
Centre gap is a key characteristic of FDD-based frequency arrangement represented by the gap between frequency blocks assigned for downlink and uplink respectively in the FDD-based arrangement as illustrated in Figure 5. It is common understanding that the duplex spacing and centre gap influence the duplexer performance so that larger separation brings the better isolation performance between downlink and uplink. Technically, this size of spacing affects the duplexer performance in the following two technical aspects:

- Self-desensitization for FDD Mobile Stations (MS) and FDD Base Stations (BS)
- MS to MS interference and BS to BS interference

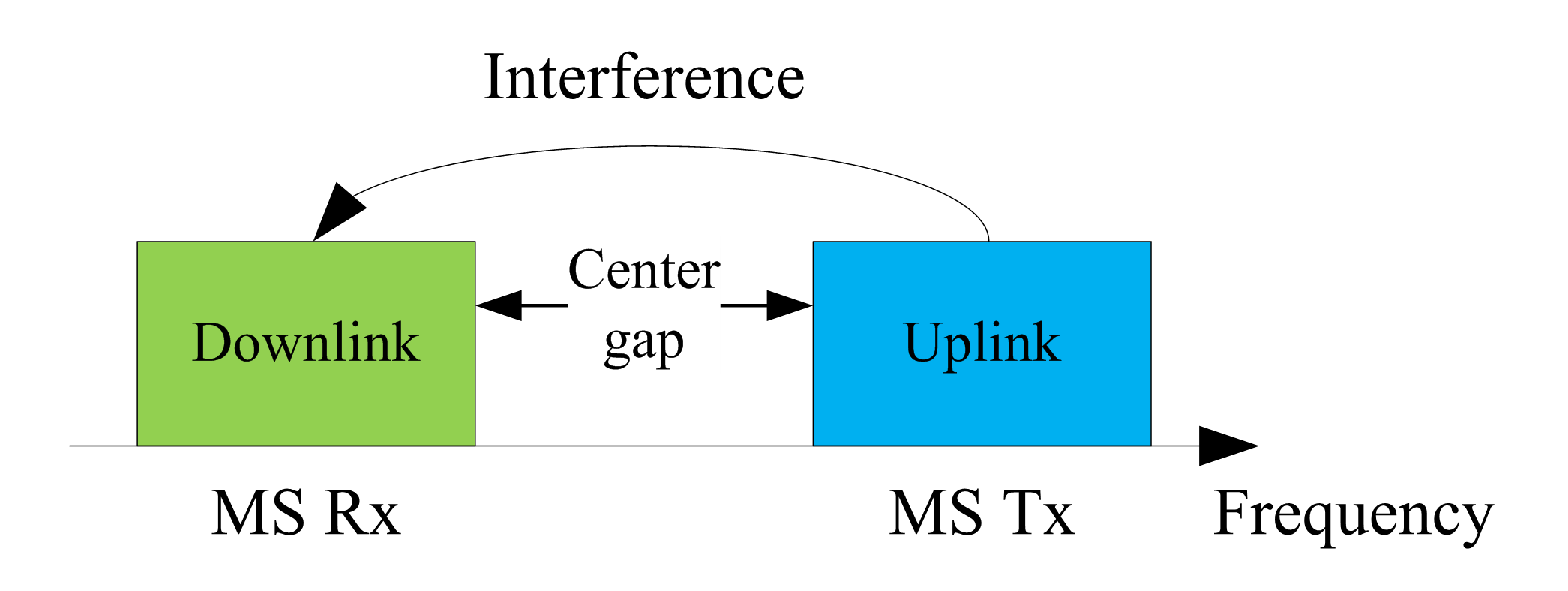
Figure 6. Interference from other MS transmitter in adjacent channel

To prevent self-desensitization, a duplexer must attenuate Tx emissions at the own Rx frequency band below the Rx noise floor. This leads typically to at least a 45 dB attenuation requirement at the own Rx frequency band. Implementing this attenuation requirement is a simple matter with the suggested 2x50 MHz arrangement by the use of a dual duplexer because the own UL and DL bands are separated by much wider separation distance the 8 MHz that would have been the case if a single duplexer is applied. The centre gap will also determine whether competitive networks can share base station sites with minimum interference and protective site filtering complexity.

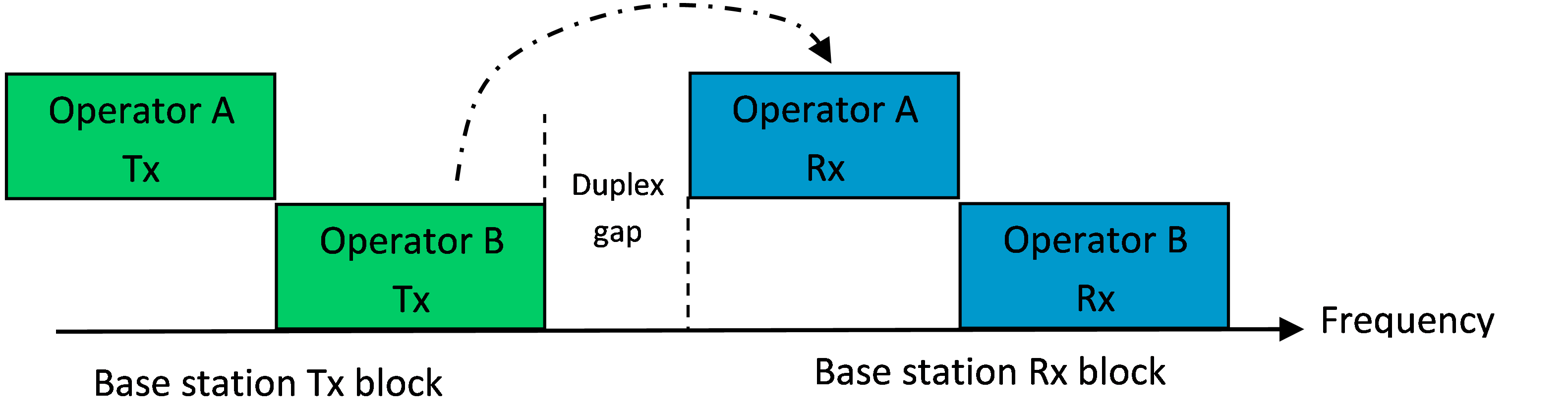
Figure 7. Interference from other network in adjacent channel

=== Guard bands ===
- a lower guard-band of 5 MHz is allocated between 698 and 703 MHz to ensure protection from the interference from TV channels that are situated in the lower bands in certain countries. This guard-band is used for cellular services in countries that elect to use the APT 600 MHz band.
- an upper guard-band of 3 MHz is allocated between 803 and 806 MHz to ensure protection from the interference from existing upper cellular bands.

=== Dual Duplexer ===
The maximum bandwidth of an RF filter or duplexer for a terminal at this frequency range is today around 30-35 MHz. Any arrangement that efficiently uses the 108 MHz bandwidth in the frequency range 698-806 MHz must thus have more than one duplexer. “Dual duplexer” means that the handset has 2 duplexers, one per sub band as illustrated in figure 8.

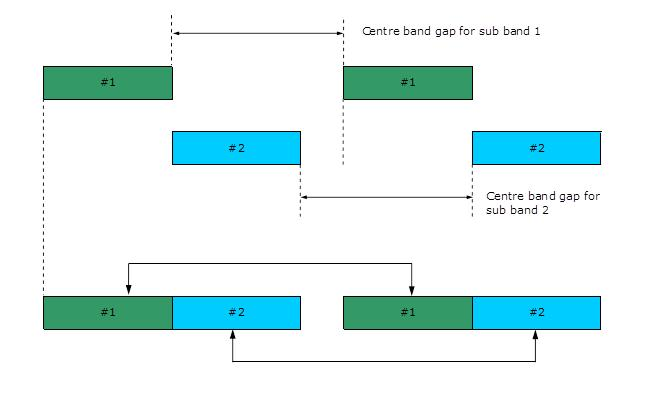
Figure 8. Illustration of the use of dual duplexers

With the use of a dual duplexer arrangement the individual duplex spacing will be increased, providing at the same time more usable spectrum for FDD. With current technology it would not be possible to implement a passband of 50 MHz with a single duplex solution. The dual duplexer arrangement may lead to a 2x50 MHz FDD band plan. Dual duplexers are being specified today and would add to the number of band specific duplexers to be accommodated in handsets where physical space is at a premium.

As of 2014, most equipment vendors have released two versions of their radio units: one dedicated to the lower band and another one dedicated to the upper band. A notable alternative is provided by Alcatel-Lucent - their RRH2x40-07APT-4R radio unit covers the entire band 28 (45 MHz) within a single radio unit thus negating the need of sourcing two different radio unit variants.

=== Coexistence of different band plans ===
Radio waves, due to its nature and physics, can cause harmful interference to networks and equipment operating in a different band plan, (i.e. in neighboring countries). That is why coherent policies and technical frameworks are routinely developed by countries to mitigate such interference. The 700 MHz band is no exception and is currently regulated by mutual agreements between countries.

As a common practice to approach such issues, there are two possible scenarios to consider:

- Both countries implement the same band plan. Adoption of similar band plans by neighboring countries will ensure alignment of uplink and downlink spectrum blocks and co channel or adjacent channel interference scenarios can be managed by existing 3GPP specifications and existing bilateral treaties between the countries.
- Both countries implement different band plans. The US and APT FDD band plans are incompatible in terms of the uplink and downlink patterns so there exists a need for coordination of spectrum along border areas. An example of this occurrence occurs at the U.S.-Mexico border. In some of such cases, the existing treaties and specification will still serve their purpose and can remain. Then, some additional engineering adjustments will be required for network deployments. The solution to this issue includes adjustments in transmitting antennas’ tilt, height, directivity, output power, or combination of those. With these protective measures, the harmful interference can be eradicated so that the radio electronic emissions at the border are kept within their mutually agreed norms.
