= British Market Research Bureau =

Former market research agency

The British Market Research Bureau (BMRB) was a market research agency, formed in London in 1933 as a spin-off from American advertising agency J. Walter Thompson. It was notable for creating the Target Group Index, a survey that is still conducted today, and for being the compiler of the first UK official singles and albums charts between 1969 and 1982.

== Background ==
In 1899, J. Walter Thompson established a subsidiary, JWT London, and became the first American agency to open an office in Britain, setting up a European Sales Office in the Strand in London. It was a relatively small office with only a handful of staff, and its purpose was to act a sales representative for European advertisers wanting to run campaigns in the US (such as the British Pears soap and Swiss Peter's chocolate). The office closed when the US joined the First World War in 1916, before re-opening in 1919 in Kingsway and then moving to Bush House in 1920. By the early 1920s, JWT London was handling advertising for five American companies in the UK, including Sun-Maid raisins and Libby’s canned fruit. In 1924, JWT published its British market research, issuing a Population Handbook of Great Britain and Ireland. That same year also saw their client Libby's advance $100,000 to break into the British market for canned goods. In 1925, JWT appointed one of their executives, Sam Meek, as the London office's manager, tasked with increasing turnover and expansion in Europe. JWT London became a full-service advertising agency, with former creative director Tom Rayfield later writing that it "soon acquired a reputation based on its American parentage, for hard-hitting, effective advertising, founded on solid research". By the early 1930s, JWT London had acquired the British accounts of a number of prestigious clients, such as Horlicks and Rowntree, and was one of the largest advertising agencies in the UK.

== History ==
In 1933, JWT decided to establish the British Market Research Bureau, a spin-off from JWT London's Research Department, claiming it to be Britain's first market research agency. It continued the department's previous work, conducting hundreds of studies for its clients, and by 1936 carried out its thousandth consumer survey. The BMRB also offered to prepare consumer studies for nonclients. In 1934, the BMRB conducted one of the largest studies for The Daily Herald, based on newspaper readership, to advise how they could improve their circulation. The suggestions, to shift from broadsheet to tabloid format, and to target downmarket by introducing strip cartoons and advice columns, was successful and boosted the newspaper's circulation. During the Second World War, the BMRB began conducting surveys for the government, including the first consumer panel for the Ministry of Food to monitor food rationing, and after the war establishing The Attwood Consumer Panel, with 2,000 randomly sampled households.

In 1969, the BMRB developed the Target Group Index, which is an in-depth year-long media and marketing single source survey that has been carried out every year since its launch.

In 1987, JWT became part of WPP Group. In 2008, WPP brought TNS, and the WPP-owned Kantar Group, restructured and consolidated, forming the division TNS-BMRB. In 2016, TNS-BMRB was then subsumed into the newly created Kantar Public, and BMRB was dissolved as a registered company.

== UK music charts ==
Prior to 1969, there was no universally accepted record chart in the UK. Instead, various newspapers and magazines such as New Musical Express, Melody Maker, Disc and Record Retailer compiled their own charts (the BBC used aggregated results of charts from the four aforementioned papers to compile their Pick of the Pops chart). These charts were also based on surveys of selected record shops. Throughout the 1960s there was talk of a standardised, official chart due to the differences between all the charts (for example, New Musical Express and Disc accepted advance order figures when compiling; and Record Retailer and Melody Maker only used store returns gathered by telephone).

Record Retailer were particularly vocal in calling for a new chart due to the lack in standing of their own chart, and the BBC too wanted to resolve the chart problem. So, in 1968, the two parties commissioned the BMRB to compile an industry singles and albums chart. In August that year, BMRB associate director Peter Menneer presented to the BBC and Record Retailer how the Bureau would compile weekly singles and albums charts record dealers based on over-the-counter sales figures provided by a panel of record dealers. By October 1968, it was announced that all the major record labels, apart from EMI, and a number of independent labels also backed the project.

Beginning on 15 February 1969, the BMRB compiled its first chart, based on postal returns from 250 record shops with a sampling cost of approximately £52,000. By the early 1970s, the BMRB charts had become established, though it had issues with the sales data being accurate and also receiving on time. With the general acceptance of the charts as the main charts, they became more targeted by chart hyping, and there were numerous reports on this, including a World in Action documentary exposé in 1980, that also showed bribery and corruption within the industry.

In May 1982, it was announced the from the beginning of January 1983, compilation of the charts would be handed over to Gallup, who in order to reduce chart hyping and errors would replace the manual compilation system of the BMRB with a more accurate computerised system.
