= Persons using television =

Television audience measurement term

PUT or Persons Using TV or People Using Television is television audience measurement term. It is used to quantify the total number of people in the target audience who are viewing television for more than five minutes during an average quarter-hour. PUT is generally expressed in percentage format. It is basically defined as the number or percentage of audience of the particular area's or market's persons that are watching television at a particular time. PUT was first given and used by Nielsen Media Research. It is used by media planners and buyers, advertisers to appropriate the ratings of channels when individual viewership is calculated. This term is usually used in the US to represent average percentage of People using TV across all channels within predefined time period. Media planners and advertisers used television ratings to broadcast programs on various channels to reach the target reach. PUT is a television rating used to analyze the television rating, which is used to strategize and evaluate television viewing on a particular daypart i.e. evening, prime-time, late night. A people meter is used to calculate the viewing habits of TV and cable audiences. PUT gets the ratings figures from people meter. PUT combines the viewing all persons watching the television in a particular house, rather than just reporting specific program viewing. The terms PUT and PVT (Persons viewing television) can be used interchangeably in common usage.

== Calculation ==
It is a term coined by Nielsen Media Research. It refers to the total number of people in a particular demographic area, that are watching television during a given time period. Nielsen defines "PUT as a percentage of the population or as a number that represents the thousands of persons viewing television." The formula used to calculate PUT is similar to HUT (Houses Using Television).

PUT = (rating / share) × 100. Nielsen's formula for PUT is the number of persons viewing TV divided by the total persons universe, i.e. the television rating divided by the total share of television in a particular demographic area. PUTs is calculated by considering the average audience figures gauged from the peopleometer, for all channels during a particular time period and adding them together to get the cumulative number. Put is used to calculate the demographic persons rating. Almost all media scales are technically based on person's ratings. It is observed that the percentage rating remains constant from year to year. If changes are observed, then they are slight in nature and only due to changes in viewing habits.

== PUT and PVT ==
Persons Using Television (PUT) and Persons Viewing Television (PVT) are both the percentage of all persons in a certain viewing area that are viewing television during a specific time period. The difference is that PVT term is used especially by Arbitron. It is a kind of persuasion process used to influence audience, a fundamental part of various advertising terms. (PVT) is used especially to denote the TV ratings in relation to the persuasion process involving the process of advertising influence which is intended to change the audiences' or prospects' attitudes and purchase behavior.
