= Record Retailer =

British music trade newspaper

Record Retailer was the only music trade newspaper for the UK record industry from 1959 to 1972. It was founded in August 1959 as a monthly newspaper covering both labels and dealers. Its founding editor was Roy Parker (who died on 27 December 1964). The title changed to Record Retailer and Music Industry News shortly after launch.

With its issue of 10 March 1960, Record Retailer became a weekly magazine and started a chart showing the top 50 records in sales. For the period until February 1969, when a standardised UK chart was established with the British Market Research Bureau, the Official Charts Company recognises the listings compiled by Record Retailer as representing the official national chart.

On 5 October 1967 the title reverted to Record Retailer and in January 1971 became Record & Tape Retailer. The publication was relaunched on 18 March 1972 as Music Week.

== See also ==
- UK singles chart
- Music Week
- Record chart
- Official Charts Company
