= Media consumption =

Usage of media

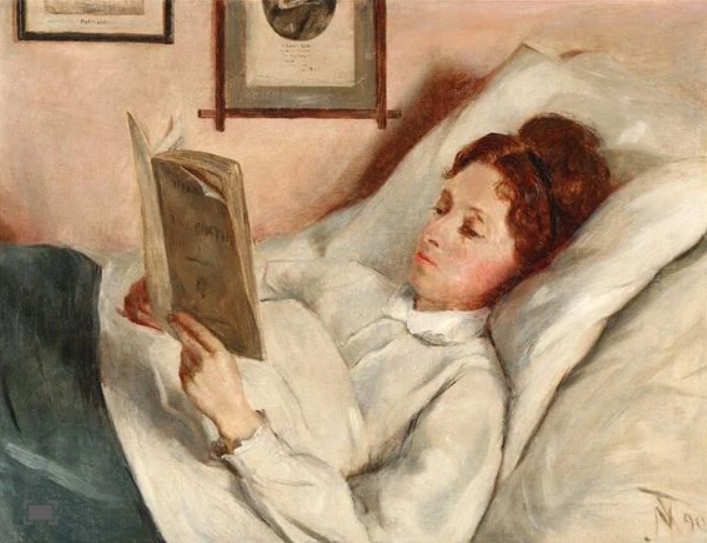
Nicoline Tuxen, Portrait of a Woman Reading in Bed

Media consumption or media diet is the sum of information and entertainment media taken in by an individual or group. Media consumption refers to how people access, use and interact with different types of media in their day-to-day lives, including both traditional and digital platforms. It includes activities such as interacting with new media, reading books and magazines, watching television and film, and listening to radio. While media consumption can be categorized as passive, research shows that audiences actively engage with content based on their own experiences and interests.

People have consumed media for centuries, and new technology increased it over time passing: the printing press, then photography and film, then television, then the internet and over social media. People spend several hours a day with media, mostly on smartphones, and often switch between different platforms. Media can help with learning and education and help people connect with others. Many media use has been linked to aggression as well as poor sleep and body image problems including mental health issues. Media consumption shapes how young people see themselves and social norms, and how the public views crime and the justice system.

== History ==
For as long as there have been words and pictures, the people of the world have been consuming media. Improved technology such as the printing press has fed increased consumption. Around 1600 the camera obscura was perfected. Light was inverted through a small hole or lens from outside and projected onto a surface or screen, creating a moving image. This new medium had a very small effect on society compared to the old ones. The development of photography in the middle 19th century made those images permanent, greatly reducing the cost of pictures. By the end of the century millions of consumers were seeing new, professionally made photographs every day.

In the 1860s mechanisms such as the zoetrope, mutoscope and praxinoscope that produced two-dimensional drawings in motion were created. They were displayed in public halls for people to observe. These new media foreshadowed the mass media consumption of later years.

Around the 1880s, the development of the motion picture camera allowed individual component images to be captured and stored on a single reel. Motion pictures were projected onto a screen to be viewed by an audience. This moving camera affected the progression of the world immensely, beginning the American film industry as well as early international movements such as German Expressionism, Surrealism and the Soviet Montage. For the first time people could tell stories on film, and distribute their works to consumers worldwide.

In the 1920s electronic television was working in laboratories, and in the 1930s hundreds of receivers were in use worldwide. By 1941 the Columbia Broadcasting System (CBS) was broadcasting two 15-minute newscasts a day to a tiny audience on its New York television station. However, the television industry did not begin to boom until the general post–World War II economic expansion. Eventually television began to incorporate color, and multiple broadcasting networks were created.

Computers were developed in the middle 20th century, and commercialized in the 1960s. Apple and other companies sold computers for hobbyists in the 1970s, and in 1981 IBM released computers intended for consumers.

On August 6, 1991, the internet and World Wide Web, long in use by computer specialists, became available to the public. This was the start of the commercialized Internet that people use today.

In 1999, Friends Reunited, one of the early social media sites were released to the public. Since then, platforms such as Myspace, Facebook, Twitter and TikTok have become more popular. Facebook and Twitter are the top social media sites in terms of usage. A 2025 Pew Research center survey found that 84% of U.S. adults use YouTube, 71% use Facebook, 50% use instagram, and 37% use TikTok.

Overall media consumption has immensely increased over time, from the era of the introduction of motion pictures, to the age of social networks and the internet.

== Trends in media consumption ==
Media consumption has grown significantly with the development of digital technologies.

People spend multiple hours per day consuming media across different platforms. Mobile devices, specifically smartphones, have added to this by allowing constant access.

According to Pew Research (2025), social media has become a major source of news and entertainment, specifically with the younger audiences.

Another trend is that consumers frequently shift between multiple platforms rather than sticking to just one.

== Effects of media consumption ==
Media consumption has been shown to influence attitudes, behaviors and perceptions through its effects depending on context and differences.

Positive Effects

There are a number of positive effects of media consumption. Television can have positive effects on children as they are growing up. Shows like Sesame Street teach valuable lessons to children in developmental stages, such as math, the alphabet, kindness, racial equality, and cooperation. Dora the Explorer introduces foreign language to children of all backgrounds in a fun, cooperative environment.

Mass media has a huge grasp on today's adolescents. Many young people use different types of social media daily. Mass media and digital platforms can also ease communication and social connection. Social media specifically allows people to interact with others across the world and learn an understanding of social norms and cultural differences.

Media relating to advertising can also have a positive effect. Some alcohol manufacturers are known to spend at least ten percent of their budget on warnings about the dangers of drinking and driving.

Research suggests that video games, including shooting games, may have positive effects on children's learning, health, and social skills.

The internet is a source of information for people of all ages, providing access to educational websites, information and services. These resources can be used for learning and research. The growth of online media has further increased access to educational material.S ocial media has also been used for activities such as crowdsourcing and allows people to interact and communicate with others in different parts of the world.

Media consumption has proven to serve as a valued asset in the educational field, serving both instructors and students alike. Media literacy is prominent amongst the youth who have high exposure to various forms of media. Students who consume media are capable of questioning the validity of the media they are exposed to, in turn developing their own sense of critical thinking. To broaden their comprehension skills, students often find it useful to question an author's purpose, the reasoning for the placement of specific images or motifs, the representation of content and its meaning to individuals, and the effects of the media on individual and societal thinking. Media related to learning is typically considered a source as well as a tool.

Negative Effects

Research identifies multiple potential negative effects that coexist with high levels of media consumption. There are many instances of violence in movies, television, video games and websites which can affect one's level of aggression. These violent depictions can desensitize viewers to acts of violence and can also provoke mimicking of the acts. Viewers subject to more violent media often believe they live in a more violent world than they actually do.

The reach of media is expanding globally and with this television has become a vice around the world. Television addiction has been labeled as the "plug-in drug" since 1977. How people watch television has also changed: by mid-2026, about 30.5% of U.S. households watched TV only through streaming services, with no cable, satellite or antenna.

In an article about media violence on society it states that extensive TV viewing among adolescents and young adults is associated with subsequent aggressive acts. Excessive media use has coexisted with negative health and behavior outcomes, like reduced physical activity, shorter attention span and disrupted sleeping patterns.

When adolescents watch television for long periods of time they spend less time being active and engaged in physical activity. Many adolescents who spend large amounts of time watching television see actors as role models and try to emulate them by trying to be like them this can also have a negative impact on people's body images, mostly women.

After seeing beautiful and thinner than average women in the media, viewers may feel worse about themselves and sometimes develop eating disorders. Some believe that the reason obesity rates have greatly increased in the last 20 years is due to increased media consumption. This is due to the fact that children are spending much more time playing video games and watching television than exercising.

Social media use has also been linked to mental health issues, especially amongst young adults, like increased anxiety, distress and overall low well-being.

Numerous studies have also shown that media consumption has a significant association with poor sleep quality. Television and computer game exposure affect children's sleep and deteriorate verbal cognitive performance.

Another problem that has developed due to increased media consumption is that people are becoming less independent. With text messaging and social media, people want instant gratification from their friends and often feel hurt if they do not receive an immediate response. Instead of having self-validation, people often need validation from others. Adding to this, constant access to phones and social media can heavily contribute to people relying on immediate responses and validation, this reduces independence.

Minorities are often shown in a negative light in the media as well; using stereotypes and dated tropes such as Black and Hispanic people being portrayed as criminals, and people from the Middle East portrayed as terrorists.

== Effects on self-esteem ==
Media has played a huge role in society for years in selling people on the expectations of how an ideal male and female body should look.

Media representations of ideal body types have been connected to lower self esteem and body dissatisfaction in men and women. These images can play significant role in eating disorders in men and women as well. The idea of body comparison goes back to Festinger's (1954) social comparison theory. Festinger argues that individuals make body comparisons in areas for which they relate. This relationship is shown through social comparison theory, suggesting people evaluate themselves by comparing them to others.

The more a person engages in body comparison, the more likely they may struggle with low self-esteem and a negative body image. Reading magazines with images of toned muscular men has been reported to lower body and "self-esteem" in men and they start worrying more about their own health and physical fitness.

== Social media and engagement ==
Social media plays a huge role in modern media consumption. Platforms like YouTube, Instagram and TikTok are used for communication, entertainment and sharing.

According to the Pew Research Center, a majority of U.S adults use at least one social media platform regularly with YouTube being the most used. These platforms encourage engagement through likes, comments, shares and reposts.

A major shift that comes along with social media is the increase of user-generated content. Consumers are no longer watching professional produced media, they will also create and distribute their own content. This then helped with the influx of influencers and online communities.

While this is happening, the spread of content on social media has then raised concerns about misinformation and if the source is credible. Information can spread rapidly without verification, users then become skeptical.

== Digital and Streaming Media ==
People in the United States today watch television in a more convenient way. According to the Advertising Research Foundation, in 2026 and 30.5% percent of the U.S households watched TV through only streaming with no cable, satellite, or antenna. This number went up from 29.5% in 2025.

Social media and online platforms have become increasingly common sources of news, alongside traditional media such as newspapers and television. Social media apps such as TikTok, Instagram and YouTube allow users to access and share news content. This trend is particularly relevant to younger generations, who spend considerable time online. However, the reliability and accuracy of news shared through these platforms can vary.

A Pew Research Centre survey had conducted in 2025 and has found that nearly 49% of adults used Youtube and Facebook daily making it one of the most popular social media platforms. Also Tik Tok is a popular site with around 24% of adults using it daily. Although this varies greatly between different age groups. About 47% of young adults aging between 18-29 use TikTok daily whereas only 5% of adults aged 65 and up use TikTok. This shows that younger adults are far more likely to use Tik Tok frequently whereas older adults will tend to use it less. Overall the survey represents shows that social media usage can vary greatly between different age groups.

== How Media Shaped Meaning for American Youth ==
American youth have personal television sets, laptops, iPods and cell phones all at their disposal. They spend more time with media than any single activity other than sleeping. As access to media has grown, media use has become integrated into everyday routines and continues to grow digitally. A 2021 Common Sense Media survey found that tweens (ages 8 to 12) spent an average of about 5.5 hours a day on screen media for entertainment, while teens (ages 13 to 18) spent about 8.5 hours a day. Media exposure is positively related to risk-taking behaviors and is negatively related to personal adjustment and school performance.

Media consumption, particularly social media consumption, plays a major role in the socialization and social behaviors of adolescents. Young adults are beginning to form an understanding of identity, behavior and social expectation from the exposure of images and symbols.

Adolescents have the ability to choose media that best suits their personalities and preferences, which in turn create youth that have a skewed view of the world and limited social interaction skills.

Social semiotics represent a significant role in how adolescents learn and employ social interaction. Impressionable adolescents regularly imitate the sign systems seen in the media. These semiotic systems affect their behavior through connotations, narratives, and myths. Adolescents are shaped by the sign systems in the media they consume. Pew Research Center showed that a majority of young adults use platforms like YouTube, Instagram and TikTok regularly. Visual content spreads rapidly and strengthens certain behaviors and ideas.

With more exposure to the media and images of models, young women are more likely to conform to the ideals of specific body images. Anorexia, bulimia and models smoking convey to girls that a feminine person is thin, beautiful, and must do certain things to her body to be attractive. A code of femininity (see media and gender) implies today that a "true" woman is thin, girlish, frail, passive, and focused on serving others. On the other hand, the code of masculinity for young males raised within the past several decades may include the ideals of profusely individualistic and self-sufficient natures, oft personified in film characters such as cowboys and outlaw bikers. The images, myths, and narratives of these ideas imply that a "true" man is a relentless problem solver, physically strong, emotionally inexpressive, and at times, a daredevil with little regard for societal expectations and the law of the land.

The idea of being judged on femininity or clothing relates to experiences later in life, including job interviews and the emphasis placed on reaching financial success.

Media consumption has become an integral part of modern culture, and has shaped younger generations through socialization and the interpretations provided for the signs and world around them.

== Social and cultural effects ==
Media consumption plays a huge role in the cultivation of young adults, as people develop patterns based on the content they consume. This shapes their understanding of social norms and influences behavior.

Media also influences behavior through symbols, narratives and representations, often studied through semiotics. This shapes how people interpret identity, gender roles and cultural expectations.

== Effect on public attitudes regarding crime and justice ==
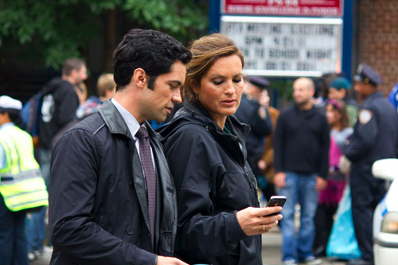
Law & Order: SVU Television viewers of crime-based shows are more fearful of crime.

Media consumption affects the public's perception of the justice system through the relationship of fear regarding crime, the perceived effectiveness of law enforcement, and the general attitudes about punishment for crime. Media consumption can influence how people perceive crime, shaping beliefs about safety and risk. The justice system has been consistently portrayed in mass media in negative tandem through the portrayal of criminals, deviants, and law enforcement officials, in turn affecting their overall perception by the public.

A 2003 study by Dowler showed the effects of media consumption influences public attitudes regarding crime and justice. Research shows that people who frequently consume crime-related media may look at the world as more dangerous than it actually is. George Gerbner's empirical studies of the impact of media consumption discovered that television viewers of crime-based shows are more fearful of crime than those who are not consuming that type of media.

A study conducted by Chermak, McGarrell, & Gruenewald focused on media coverage of police misconduct, producing results where greater consumption of media portraying dishonesty amongst law enforcement led to increasing confirmation bias in the direction of the officer's guilt.

Overall, the media's idea of crime and law enforcement can shape public attitudes toward justice and punishment.
