= People meter =

Television audience measurement tool

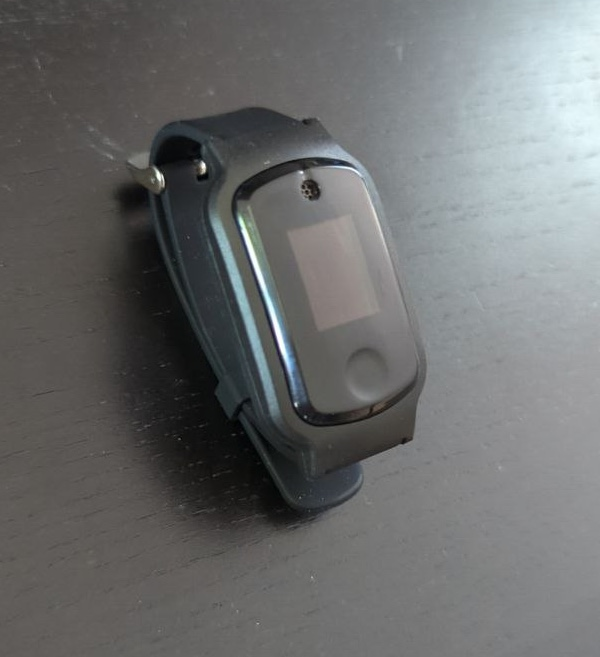
Portable People Meter

A people meter is an audience measurement tool used to measure the viewing habits of TV and cable audiences.

== Meter ==
The People Meter is a 'box', about the size of a paperback book. The box is hooked up to each television set and is accompanied by a remote control unit. Each family member in a sample household is assigned a personal 'viewing button'. It identifies each household member's age and sex. If the TV is turned on and the viewer doesn't identify themselves, the meter flashes to remind them. Additional buttons on the People Meter enable guests to participate in the sample by recording their age, sex and viewing status into the system.

Another version of the device is small, about the size of a beeper, that plugs into the wall below or near each TV set in household. It monitors anything that comes on the TV and relays the information with the small Portable People Meter to narrow down who is watching what and when.

The device, known as a 'frequency-based meter', was invented by a British company called Audits of Great Britain (AGB). The successor company to AGB is TNS, which is active in 34 countries around the globe.

Originally, these meters identified the frequency of the channels— VHF or UHF— watched on the viewer's TV set. This system became obsolete when Direct to Home (DTH) satellite dish became popular and viewers started to get their own satellite decoders. In addition, this system doesn't measure digital broadcasts.

Before the People Meter advances, Nielsen used the diary method, which consisted of viewers physically recording the shows they watched. However, there were setbacks with the system. Lower-rated stations claimed the diary method was inaccurate and biased. They argued that because they had lower ratings, those who depended on memory for the diary method may only remember to track their favorite shows. Stations also argued that if it wasn't low ratings that skewed the diary method, it might also be the new variety of channels for viewers to choose from. Viewers may not be able to record everything they watch and there is no way of discovering the truth. Finally in 1986, Nielsen developed an electronic meter, People Meter, to solve the problem. The People Meter is an electronic method of television measurement that moved from active and diary-based to passive and meter-monitored. The meter also recorded real time simultaneously viewing, reducing memory bias.

Because Audits of Great Britain (AGB) had just entered the U.S. market executing similar technology, Nielsen felt the need to compete. Nielsen made a substantial technological advance before network-era norms entered crisis with transition to the national People Meter sample in 1987. Although People Meters presented substantial improvements over the previous system, the alteration in audience measurement caused significant controversy. The method change cost stations whose audience had been overestimated. The networks firmly disagreed; they pointed out that certain demographics such as young children could not operate the people meter accurately, thus underestimating the number of children watching a particular program. Overall ratings after the people meter's introduction dropped 9% year-over-year; the Saturday morning cartoon block, in contrast, plummeted 29%, which ABC executive Squire Rushnell blamed specifically on children not being able to operate the people meter, leading Rushnell to abandon efforts to air preschool-oriented programs and aim the Saturday block toward older children who could operate a people meter. The end of the multi-channel transition was in large part due to the continuous changes in technology and distribution. Nielsen was at a disadvantage as their measuring techniques required burdensome adjustments. Luckily for Nielsen, the advances in advertising strategies, distribution windows, and ways people were using television made industry sectors interested in data about viewing behavior.

== Local People Meter ==
Along with changing their counting methods, Nielsen also started emphasizing their sample in 2003 in reaction to census shifts and requests from some industry sectors. Nielsen's automated Local People Meter (LPM) technology was introduced in New York and Los Angeles. The LPM improved the method of measurement from active and diary-based to passive and meter-monitored. More importantly, the LPM provides accurate measurements to particular local markets, versus a nationwide sample from the People meter. While diary-based surveys concentrated on quarterly “sweeps” periods, the industry has been pushed towards year-round measurement, due to the automated LPM system.

"Nielsen introduced the LPM as evidence of the rupturing of the network-era business model became broadly apparent, and apprehension about the future of the industry erupted on all sectors. LPM’s more accurately reported full range of what programming viewers watched, including what was observed when channel surfing, in comparison to the diary method it replaced. It allowed Nielsen to maintain established measurement practices, but do them better”.

“While Nielsen’s LPM’s presented next-day demographic analyses on television viewership in major cities, the devices led to accusations of undercounting minorities. A lot of controversy surrounding LPM’s was driven by News Corporation-funded “Don’t Count Us Out” alliance, which exploited activists’ and legislators’ foreseeable mindless reactions to any suggestion of racism” (Lowry, 2004).

== Portable People Meter ==
Today there are new systems such as the Portable People Meter and 'Picture Matching' measuring the viewing habits of TV audiences. In an effort to improve the accuracy of radio ratings, Arbitron and Nielsen Media Research are testing a "portable people meter" (PPM) for radio. This new device is to be clipped to an individual's clothing. Radio stations encode an inaudible, unique signal as part of their broadcasts. The PPM "hears" this signal and records the station and the time spent listening. Such a device requires far less effort on the part of respondents.

== See also ==
- Single-source data

== Sources ==
- Downey, Kevin (2001-10-01). "Nielsen: It's a go for the people meter". Media Life.
- Lotz, Amanda D. "The Television Will Be Revolutionized." New York University Press. Retrieved April 16, 2011.
- Stoddard Jr., Laurence R. 'The History of People Meters. How we got where we are(and why)', Journal of Advertising Research, Oct/Nov 87, Vol. 27 Issue 5.
- Lowry, Brian. "Fox gives Nielsen, politicos a lesson in hardball". 12 May 2004. Variety: August 16–22, 2004, Vol 395 Issue 13, p 14–16, 2p.
