= Desensitization (telecommunications) =

In telecommunications, desensitization (also known as receiver blocking) is a form of electromagnetic interference where a radio receiver is unable to receive a weak radio signal that it might otherwise be able to receive when there is no interference. This is caused by a nearby transmitter with a strong signal on a close frequency, which overloads the receiver and makes it unable to fully receive the desired signal.

Typical receiver operation is such that the Minimum Detectable Signal (MDS) level is determined by the thermal noise of its electronic components. When a signal is received, additional spurious signals are produced within the receiver because it is not truly a linear device. When these spurious signals have a power level that is less than the thermal noise power level, then the receiver is operating normally. When these spurious signals have a power level that is higher than the thermal noise floor, then the receiver is desensitized. This is because the MDS has risen due to the level of the spurious signals. Spurious signals increase in level when the received signal strength increases.

When an interfering signal is present, it can contribute to the level of the spurious signals. Stronger interference generates stronger spurious signals. The interference may be at a different frequency than the signal of interest, but the spurious signals caused by that interference can show up at the same frequency as the signal of interest. It is these spurious signals that degrade the ability of the receiver by raising the MDS.

Consider the case of a repeater station, a station consisting of a transmitter and receiver, both operating at the same time, but on separate frequencies, and in some cases, separate antennas. Elevated MDS can be experienced in this case as well. One way to correct this condition is adding a duplexer to the station. This is common in Land Mobile Radio services such as police, fire, various commercial and amateur service.

== See also ==
- Receiver (radio)
- Sensitivity (electronics)
- Minimum detectable signal
