= Desensitization =

Desensitization can refer to:

- Desensitization (telecommunications)
- Desensitization (medicine)
- Desensitization (psychology)
- Desensitization of explosives, see Phlegmatized
- Desensitization, Allergen immunotherapy
- Desensitization, another name for Exposure therapy
