= Estrogen receptor test =

Laboratory test

The estrogen receptor test (ERT) is a laboratory test to determine whether cancer cells have estrogen receptors. This information can guide treatment of the cancer.

The test uses immunohistochemical techniques on the estrogen receptor (ER). Immunohistochemistry (IHC) methods involve selective identification of antigen proteins by exploiting antigen–antibody relationships.

== History ==
Historically, the ligand binding assay was used to determine ER activity. This method was limited because large quantities of fresh tissue were needed for each assay. IHC can be performed on fixed tissue and needle biopsies, and is more accurate in assessing ER status of a tumor.

Today, ER analysis is one of many routinely performed immunohistochemical assays performed to classify hormone receptor status of breast cancers to provide insight into cancer prognosis and management.

== Estrogen receptor types ==
There are two main types of estrogen receptor (ER): estrogen receptor alpha (ERα), and estrogen receptor beta (ER-β), also known as NR3A2. Both are nuclear receptors activated by the sex hormone estrogen. Estrogen signaling can be selectively stimulated or inhibited, dependent on the equilibrium of these two receptor types in target organs. These two ER types are encoded by different genes located on separate chromosomes and have different functions. ERα is encoded by the ESR1 (Estrogen Receptor 1) gene, is mostly active in the mammary gland and uterus, and aids in the regulation of skeletal homeostasis and metabolism. ER-β plays a prominent role in the central nervous and immune systems.

== Immunohistochemical assessment ==
The ERT immunohistochemical assessment is a semi-quantitative method used to predict the likelihood of successful treatment of breast cancer with anti-estrogen therapy. ER-positive breast carcinomas are likely to respond to endocrine treatments. Therefore, monitoring ER activity can be essential in understanding disease progression and guiding treatment.

Various target antibodies may be used in the IHC assessment of the ER. Typically, the antibody used is the anti-Estrogen Receptor (ER) (SP1) Rabbit Monoclonal Antibody. Employing SP1 allows detection of estrogen receptor (ER) antigens in sections of the fixed tissue samples. In conjunction with light microscopy, approximate ER activity can be estimated using the level of staining of the cell's components. The anti-ER (SP1) antibody targets the ER alpha protein (ERα) located in the nucleus of ER-positive cells. The anti-ER (SP1) antibody's response is a useful indication of the progression, management, and prediction of therapy outcome of breast cancer. These antibodies are commercially available from three commonly used auto strain vendors: Dako, Leica, and Ventana. In a study by Kornaga et al., all behaved similarly in the semi-quantitative analysis of breast cancer biopsy samples.

In a study in 2002, six breast carcinoma cases were received, characterized, and analyzed through the ERT IHC assessment. The level of known ER activity was classified (negative, low, medium, and high) and selected for observation. After embedment in a paraffin block, the samples were stained using a hematoxylin and eosin staining (H & E staining) system. The IHC analysis was performed on the same day using anti-ER monoclonal antibodies. There was a consistently strong correlation between the IHC results and the known ER activity.

== Estrogen receptor test and breast cancer ==
Observation of estrogen receptor activity provides insight into growth and proliferation of breast cancer. The complex biochemical reactions of estrogen receptors are necessary for the mediation of cellular interactions in response to various cell-altering factors, including ligands, cofactors, and other simulative complexes.

=== Monitoring tumor development with the estrogen receptor test ===
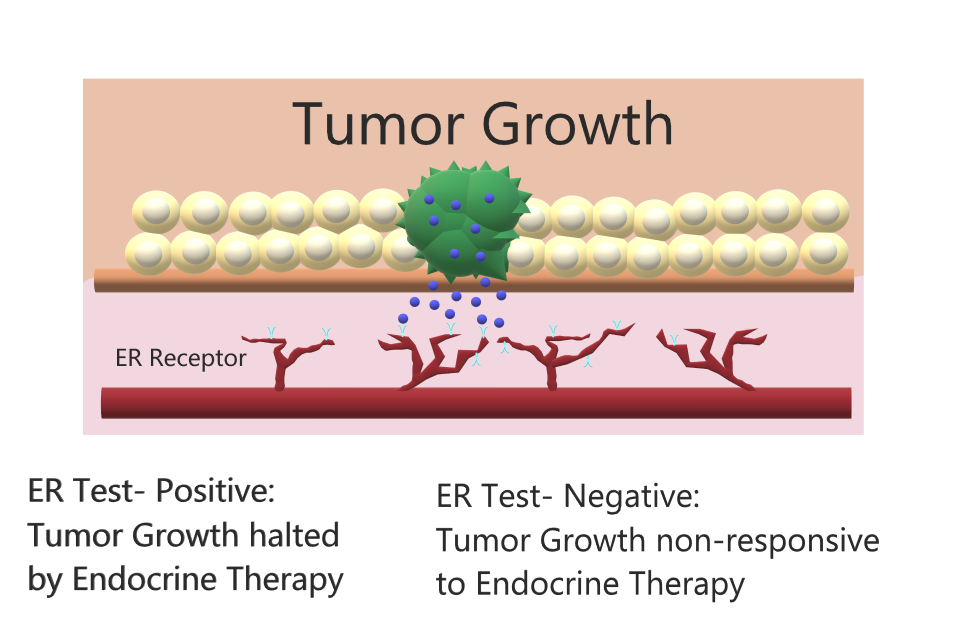
Tumor Growth

The estrogen receptor is a regulator of cellular functions, including cell growth and proliferation, and can serve as a means of inter-cellular differentiation. Monitoring the activity of the ER via the ERT is necessary as it plays an essential role in normal breast development and function, as well as in cancerous situations. Accurate measurements of the ER activities are critical in the initial classification and monitoring of progression in breast cancers. The ER can serve as an indicative biomarker as it is a potential predictor for the clinical responses of a patient to certain treatments. Patients with breast cancer that is ER-positive at presentation are most likely to respond to cancer treatments through endocrine therapy.

=== Estrogen receptor test in mammary epithelial cancer ===
Estrogen receptors are over-expressed in approximately 70% of diagnosed breast cancers. Growing exposure of the mammary epithelium to estrogen is related to the risk of breast cancer as the binding of estrogen to the HER2 receptor in mammary cells causes a rise in the division and cell synthesis. This ultimately leads to a higher risk of replication errors, and the disruption of the normal cellular processes results in mistakes in apoptosis, cellular proliferation, or DNA repair.

The ERT has been suggested as a predictor for the level of success of the use of endocrine therapy in cancer treatment. Many of the endocrine therapies for breast cancer treatments involve the use of selective estrogen receptor modulators (SERMs). SERMs, such as tamoxifen, are ER antagonists in breast tissue. Estrogen receptor tests are used in determining the sensitivity of breast cancer lesions to tamoxifen. Patients with ER-positive tumors are likely to respond well to these endocrine therapies.
