= Portable People Meter =

Proprietary electronic system used for radio and television ratings gathering

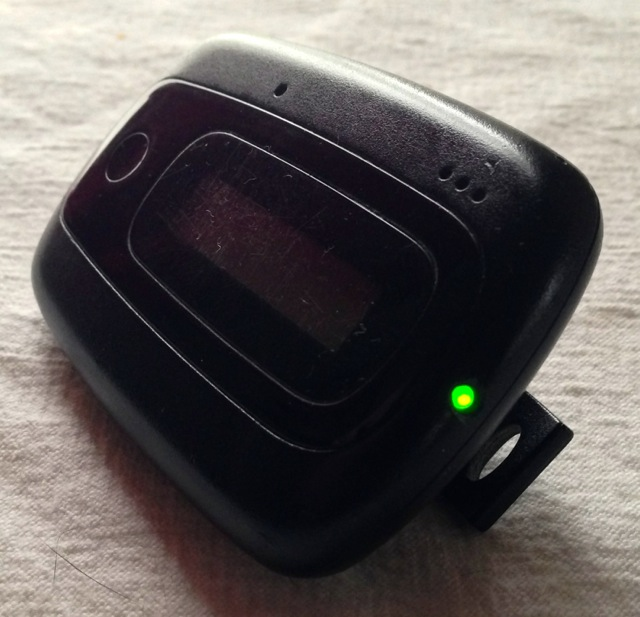
A Portable People Meter worn by Nielsen Audio panelists to monitor media exposure

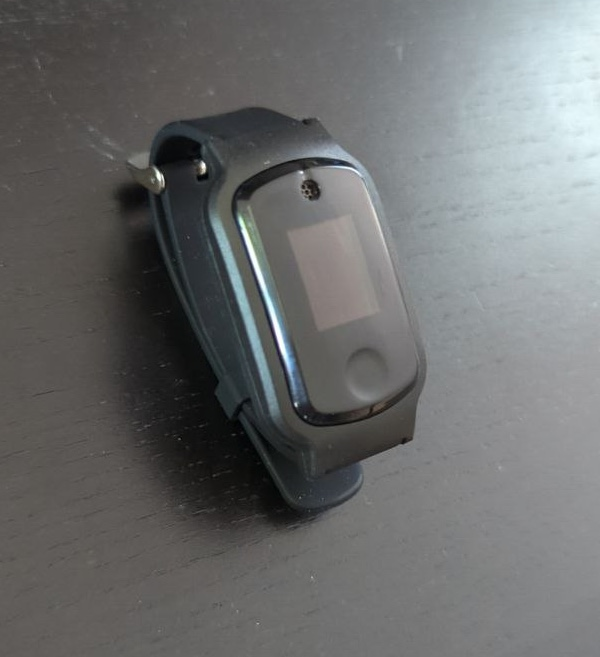
The newer NPM-1 Portable People Meter (FCC ID 2ASUZ-NPM-1) installed in a wristband.

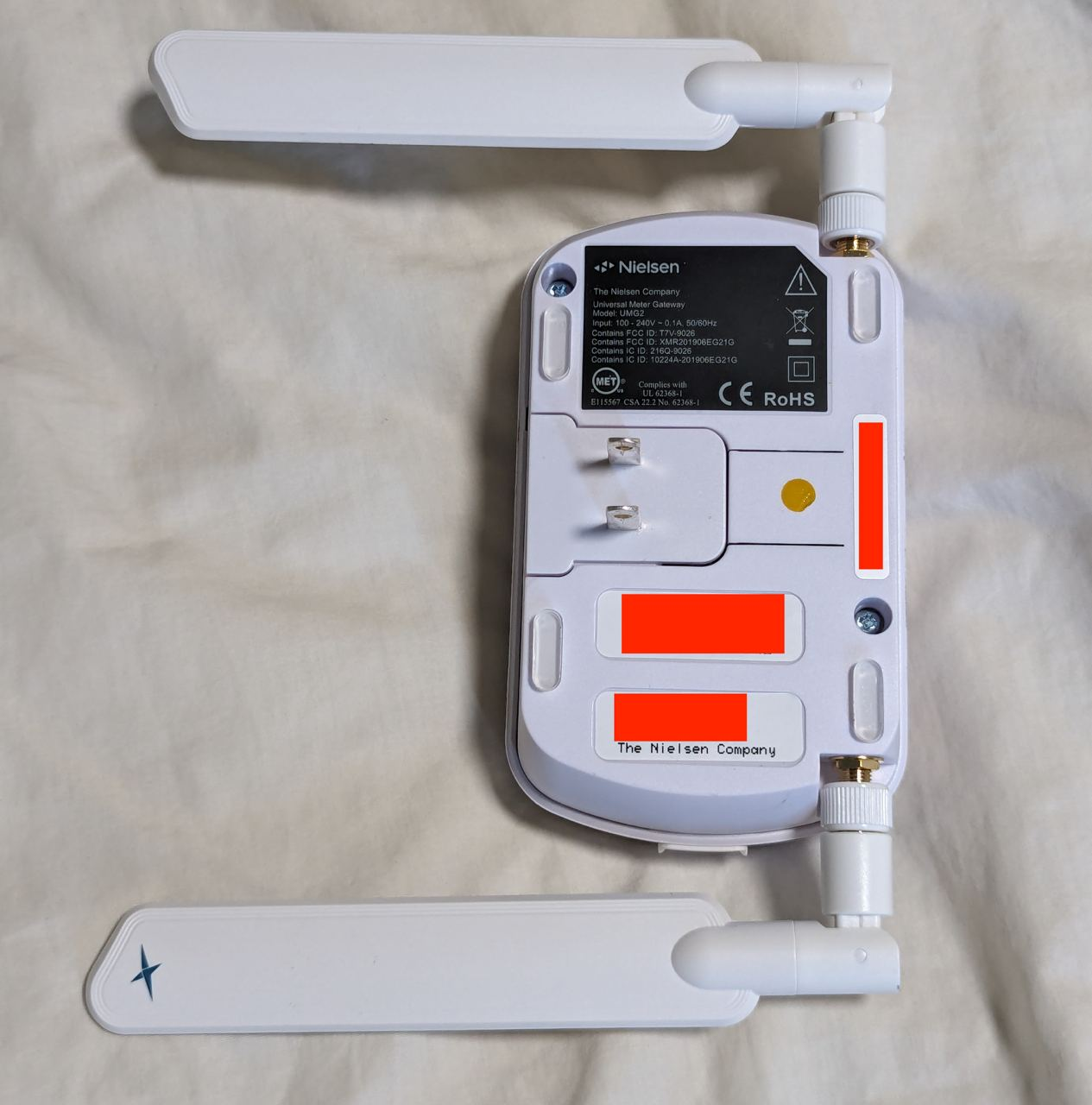
Nielsen Universal Meter Gateway UMG-2, which uses BLE to connect to the meters and uploads the collected data via LTE.

The Portable People Meter (PPM), also known as the Nielsen Meter, is a system developed by Arbitron (now Nielsen Audio) to measure how many people are exposed to individual radio stations and television stations. This also includes cable television. The PPM is worn like a pager and detects hidden audio tones within a station or network's audio stream, logging each time it finds a signal.

There are several parts to the PPM system:

- An encoder that inserts the tones subliminally into a station's or broadcast network's airchain via psychoacoustic masking.
- A monitor that checks that the encoder is working properly.
- The wearable Portable People Meter carried by each panelist.
- A base station for each PPM, where each panelist in the household places it overnight to recharge the battery.
- A portable charger for vacations and other trips away from the home base.

The PPM's original concept requires the base station connection to a telephone line in order to transmit panelists' listening data from the PPM to the collection point. The PPM 360, introduced in 2010, uses cellular telephone technology to accomplish this without the need for a wired telephone service. Additionally, it has a motion sensor which detects when the PPM is being worn by an active person. After 30 minutes of inactivity, the PPM goes into a low-power "sleep" mode in order to conserve battery life.

The newer generation NPM-1 meter was introduced in 2021. According to FCC filings, the meter uses Bluetooth Low Energy to transmit collected data to a gateway or the user's smartphone, while the accompanying gateway includes a Quectel EG21-G 4G LTE module as data uplink.

== History ==
The original concept for the PPM can be traced to a brainstorming session at Arbitron in November 1988. Concerns over the forthcoming move from analog video to high-definition digital television had engineers concerned that the technology then in use would become obsolete overnight. Drawing upon his experience in testing laboratories, Dr. Gerald Cohen proposed embedding an identifying signal in the audio and later decoding it. Dr. Cohen argued that audio was less likely to undergo as drastic a change in content and technology as would video, hence any technology developed would likely not become obsolete in a few years.

The concept was presented to the company and also written up in a short concept document. A preliminary investigation was undertaken, but the technology was never given serious consideration. The concept was written off and forgotten, as Arbitron had larger issues in its competition with the Nielsen Company for television ratings. After losing to Nielsen Company, Arbitron went back to its core business—radio ratings.

Dr. Cohen's idea lay dormant until 1992, when Dr. Richard Schlunt and Dr. Patrick Nunally approached Arbitron. Meeting with Ronald Kolessar the Director of Technology, Dr. Cohen and others presented a new variation of the idea—selectively embed a code into the frequency spectrum of the baseband audio stream and use digital signal processing in a small wearable device to recover the embedded code buried in what a person watches or hears.

Convinced that the concept could be achieved, Mr. Kolessar obtained approval from Arbitron's management to undertake a fast-track effort to determine feasibility. Lacking the internal expertise to do so, additional outside help from the company, Martin Marietta, was sought. Facing cutbacks in the defense industry, Martin Marietta agreed to take on the commercial project, relinquishing all rights to the technology they would develop. Engineers at Martin Marietta decided that the best approach was to employ the principle of psychoacoustics to mask the embedded code signal, an approach described in US Patent No. 5450490 .

Now that Dr. Cohen's idea was a full-fledged project with management support, engineers at Arbitron focused on improving the encoding and detection methodology and miniaturization into a hand-held device. Additional capabilities such as motion detection were added later on.

In 2005, EE Times, as part of their Great Minds, Great Ideas project, profiled Mr. Kolessar as the "Inventor of the Portable People Meter".

== Research reports ==
Arbitron, as well as other firms that provide research and consulting services to radio stations, have begun publishing numerous studies based on analysis of PPM data.

Although the PPM delivers empirical, verifiable audience measurement data, these results are sometimes at odds with the results generated with the diary method, which asks listeners to note each change of their radio dial. Some minority diarists may have used their diaries as a way to support and show loyalty for stations that targeted their communities. Around 2008, the Spanish Radio Association (SRA) and a number of politicians challenged Arbitron and the PPM's accuracy in measuring minority listening.

== Criticism ==
Although the makers of the PPM claim that it is more accurate than traditional alternatives like handwritten logs or wired meters, critics have raised issues about its accuracy. Another sales argument is that the device is immune to human forgetfulness, something that can be an issue in studies that rely on self-reporting by test subjects.

Some radio producers have seen their audience numbers plummet in cities where Arbitron adopted the PPM. Arbitron settled with five states that brought discrimination suits and promised more representative sampling. Radio host Delilah blamed the device for "horrendous" damage to her measured audience numbers. One potential culprit raised by critics is the psychoacoustic masking techniques used to embed the signal; Delilah, for example, has suggested that the masking causes the signal to get lost in certain styles of music, thus not getting picked up by the PPM and artificially lowering the radio station's listenership.
Nielsen introduced eCBET in 2016, which they touted as an enhancement for the tone encoding process. Consequently, there have been some complaints from some in the radio industry that the upgrade caused the audio to sound harsh and unlistenable.

== See also ==
- Numeris
- Single-source data
