= Minimum detectable signal =

A minimum detectable signal is a signal at the input of a system whose power allows it to be detected over the background electronic noise of the detector system. It can alternately be defined as a signal that produces a signal-to-noise ratio of a given value m at the output. In practice, m is usually chosen to be greater than unity. In some literature, the name sensitivity is used for this concept.

When the resulting signal is then interpreted by a human operator, as in radar systems, the related term minimum discernible signal may be used. This includes additional factors like clutter and the lifetime of the signal on the radar display. In the case of a just-detectable signal, the resulting blip on the radar display may be too small or too fleeting to be recognized. Depending on what effects are considered, the term minimum visible signal may be used to consider only whether the signal may be visible on the display, ignoring other effects like clutter.

== General ==
In general, it is clear that for a receiver to "see" a signal it has to be greater than the noise floor. To actually detect the signal, however, it is often required to be at a power level greater than the noise floor by an amount that is dependent on the type of detection used as well as other factors. There are exceptions to this requirement but coverage of these cases is outside the scope of this article. This required difference in power levels of the signal and the noise floor is known as the signal-to-noise ratio (SNR). To establish the minimum detectable signal (MDS) of a receiver we require several factors to be known.

- Required signal-to-noise ratio (SNR)
- Detection bandwidth (BW)
- Temperature T_{0} of the receiver system
- Receiver noise figure (NF)

To calculate the minimum detectable signal we first need to establish the noise floor in the receiver by the following equation:

$$\begin{align}\text{Noise floor}_\textrm{dBm}
& = 10\ \log_{10}(k T_0\times \mathrm{BW} / 1\,\textrm{mW})\ \textrm{dBm} + \mathrm{NF} \\
& = 10\ \log_{10}(k T_0 \frac \textrm{Hz}\textrm{mW})\ \textrm{dBm} + \mathrm{NF} +10\ \log_{10}( \mathrm{BW} / 1\,\textrm{Hz})\ \textrm{dB}
\end{align}$$

Here, k ≈ 1.38×10^{−23} J/K is the Boltzmann constant and kT_{0} is the available noise power density (the noise is thermal noise, Johnson noise).

As a numerical example: A receiver has a bandwidth of 100 MHz, a noise figure of 1.5 dB and the physical temperature of the system is 290 K.

$$\begin{align}\text{Noise floor}_\textrm{dBm}
& = 10\ \log_{10}(1.38\times 10^{-23} \times 290 \times 10^3 )\ \textrm{dBm} + 1.5\ \textrm{dB} +10\ \log_{10}( 100\times10^6 )\ \textrm{dB} \\
& = -174\ \textrm{dBm} + 1.5\ \textrm{dB} +80\ \textrm{dB}\\
& = -92.5\ \textrm{dBm}
\end{align}$$

So for this receiver to even begin to "see" a signal it would need to be greater than −92.5 dBm. Confusion can arise because the level calculated above is also sometimes called the Minimum Discernable Signal (MDS). For the sake of clarity, we will refer to this as the noise floor of the receiver. The next step is to take into account the SNR required for the type of detection we are using. If we need the signal to be 10 times more powerful than the noise floor the required SNR would be 10 dB. Calculating the actual minimum detectable signal is simply a case of adding the required SNR to the noise floor:

$$\text{MDS}_\text{dBm}= \text{Noise floor}_\textrm{dBm}+\text{SNR}_\textrm{dB}$$

So for the example above this would mean that the minimum detectable signal is $\text{MDS}_\textrm{dBm} = -92.5\,\text{dBm}+10\,\text{dB}=-82.5\,\text{dBm}$.

The equation above indicates several ways in which the minimum detectable signal of a receiver can be improved. If one assumes that the bandwidth and SNR are fixed however by the application, then one way of improving MDS is by lowering the receiver's physical temperature. This lowers the NF of the receiver by reducing the internal thermally produced noise. These types of receivers are referred to as cryogenic receivers.

== Definitions ==
=== Noise figure and noise factor ===
Noise figure (NF) is noise factor (F) expressed in decibels. F is the ratio of the input signal-to-noise ratio (SNR_{i}) to the output signal-to-noise ratio (SNR_{o}). F quantifies how much the signal degrades with respect to the noise because of the presence of a noisy network. A noiseless amplifier has a noise factor F = 1, so the noise figure for that amplifier is NF = 0 dB: a noiseless amplifier does not degrade the signal to noise ratio as both signal and noise propagate through the network.

If the bandwidth in which the information signal is measured turns out not to be 1 Hz wide, then the term 10 log_{10}(bandwidth) allows for the additional noise power present in the wider detection bandwidth.

=== Signal-to-noise ratio ===
Signal-to-noise ratio (SNR) is the degree to which the input signal power is greater than the noise power within the bandwidth B of interest. In the case of some digital systems a 10 dB difference between the noise floor and the signal level might be necessary; this 10 dB SNR allows a bit error rate (BER) to be better than some specified figure (e.g. 10^{−5} for some QPSK schemes). For voice signals the required SNR might be as low as 6 dB and for CW (Morse code) it might extend, with a trained listener, down to 1 dB difference (tangential sensitivity). Usable in this context then means it conveys adequate information for decoding by a person or a machine with acceptable and defined levels of error.
