= Ente Radio Trieste =

Ente Radio Trieste (ERT) was the public service radio broadcaster of the Free Territory of Trieste between 1947 and 1955. It was created during the Allied Military Government administration of Zone A and survived until shortly after the transfer of civil administration to Italy.

== Background ==
Radio broadcasting in Trieste began in 1931, when the EIAR opened a transmitting station on Monte Radio. During the Second World War, the station passed through a succession of administrations: Italy, the German military administration of the Adriatisches Küstenland, and Yugoslav occupation in May–June 1945.

In June 1945 the Allied Military Government of the Province of Venezia Giulia (AMG-VG) took control, renaming it "Radio Trieste" and later reorganising it into the Ente Radio Teatro Trieste together with the local opera house and philharmonic. This body was short-lived and was dissolved in March 1947, when the autonomous Ente Radio Trieste was formally established.

== Free Territory of Trieste ==
On 15 September 1947 the Paris Peace Treaties created the Free Territory of Trieste. At the same time, Radio Trieste was reorganised as the official public broadcaster for Zone A, under the name Ente Radio Trieste.

The ERT maintained its own postal agency and enjoyed a measure of autonomy, producing original programmes in Italian and other local languages. Despite this, it remained closely linked to the Italian radio network and cultural institutions of the city.

With the entry into force of the Peace Treaties in 1947, for reasons of public accounting, all staff of the Allied Military Government, including those at the ERT, were dismissed and re-hired the following day. Until October 1948 there was no official relationship between the Ente Radio Trieste and the RAI, which regarded with concern the possibility of a permanent broadcaster in Trieste, as it had quickly developed from a small relay station into a radio production centre of European importance.

== Return to Italy ==
Following the London Memorandum of 1954, civil administration of Zone A passed to the Italian government on 25 October 1954. Radio Trieste re-entered the RAI network in August 1953, before the official handover, but retained several hours of local programming.

Ente Radio Trieste continued its activity under Italian administration until 1957, reorganised under Vittorio Malinverni as president, Guido Candussi as director and Luigi Fonda as deputy director. During this period it broadcast some RAI programmes, expanded Slovenian-language transmissions, and extended coverage to the provinces of Gorizia and Friuli. A convention between ERT and RAI formalised its suppression and the creation of Radio Trieste within the national network.
