= Single-source data =

Single-source data (also single source) is the measurement of TV and/or other mass media's advertising exposure and purchase behavior, over time for the same individual or household. This measurement is gauged through the collection of data components supplied by one or more parties overlapped through a single integrated system of data collection matched to the person or household level. How these data are stored is known as a single-source database.

In TV advertising measurement, single-source data is used to explore how advertising exposure influences individuals or households' loyalty and buying behavior across different windows of time, e.g., year, quarter, month, and week. Single-source data is a compilation of 1, home-scanned sales records and/or loyalty card purchases from retail or grocery stores and other commercial operations. 2, ad exposure (or not) from TV tune-in data from cable set-top boxes or people meters (pushbutton or passive) or household tuning meters. Lastly, 3, Household demographic information.

The significance of single-source data resides in its ability to provide a natural and controlled measurement of advertising effectiveness within the market, particularly through the comparison of exposed and non-exposed consumers. This data exhibits a longitudinal structure and offers a high level of dis-aggregation, both at the individual and temporal levels. Single-source data serves to illuminate variations in household exposure to a brand's advertisements and their corresponding purchasing patterns in the context of advertising fluctuations.

== Companies ==
"Project Apollo" was designed to be a single source, national market research service based on Nielsen's Home Scan technology for measuring consumer purchase behavior, combined with Arbitron's Portable People Meter system, measuring electronic media exposure. In January 2006, The Nielsen Company and Arbitron Inc. completed the deployment of a national pilot panel of more than 11,000 persons in 5,000 households. Seven advertisers (Kraft, Pepsi, Pfizer, Procter & Gamble, S.C. Johnson, Unilever, and Walmart) signed on as members of the Project Apollo Steering Committee. The Committee worked with Arbitron and Nielsen to evaluate the utility of multimedia and purchase information from a common sample of consumers. Individuals within the sample were given incentives to voluntarily carry Arbitron's Portable People Meter, a small, pager-sized device that collects the person's exposure to electronic media sources: broadcast television networks, cable networks, and network radio as well as audio-based commercials broadcast on these platforms. Consumer exposure to other media such as newspapers, magazines, and circulars was collected through additional survey instruments. The project was shuttered in February 2008 due to sample size, cost, and insufficient client commitment.

Prior to Apollo, there were other attempts to provide single-source measurement in the U.S., including Arbitron's Scan America, which used pushbutton people meters; IRI's use of household tuning meters in its Behavior Scan markets; ADTEL; and ERIM. Outside the U.S. there have also been such efforts that have been discontinued except in England and in France where small single-source panels survive. In Germany and the Netherlands, the research agency GfK is currently running single-source panels under the name "Media Efficiency Panel" (MEP). In MEP online behavior and advertising contacts are measured in detail using a NURAGO browser plug-in. Off-line media consumption is measured using validated media consumption questionnaires. FMCG purchases are captured using a household scanner and durable purchases using an online system asking respondents to check in and register what goods they bought, where they bought them, and for what price. The German panel was launched in 2008 and is currently experimenting with the audio measurement using a mobile phone to capture advertising contacts on TV. More than 70 studies have currently been done in this panel by a large variety of advertisers. The Dutch panel was launched in July 2010.

To circumvent the problem of unsustainable costs which brought down Project Apollo, cross-media analytics company All Media Count uses survey data from a longitudinal panel and behavioral modeling to generate individual panelists' daily media contact data for more than 10,000 media vehicles across eleven media types in China.

The term “single source” is often credited to Colin McDonald who while at BMRB in England in 1966 used to purchase and view diaries rather than electronic means to conduct the first quasi-single source measurement. Although electronic means of data capture are preferred for accuracy and to minimize respondent fatigue, cost-effective methods for doing this do not yet exist for several media (magazines, newspapers, subway, transport, ambient). Also, many markets - such as China - do not have the universal electronic measurement, even for TV.

Services such as MRI, Roy Morgan, Simmons, TGI, and others around the world that collect such information by non-electronic or hybrid means are sometimes considered to be single source, where the data are obtained from a single panel of respondents.

Despite the enthusiasm and the success of such data, single source has been plagued by high costs and small sample sizes.

== See also ==
- Audience measurement
- Media market
