= Encoder receiver transmitter =

Packet radio protocol for automatic meter reading

Encoder receiver transmitter (ERT) is a packet radio protocol developed by Itron for automatic meter reading. The technology is used to transmit data from utility meters over a short range so a utility vehicle can collect meter data without a worker physically inspecting each meter.

The ERT protocol was first described in U.S. patent 4,614,945. More technical detail is explained in later U.S. patent 4,799,059.

== Technical details ==
ERT is an OOK modulated radio signal which is transmitted in the unlicensed 900-920 MHz band. The message is transmitted in the clear and uses Manchester encoding. The protocol uses frequency-hopping, a multiple access method to avoid interference with other nearby meters. SCM and IDM packet formats are described in U.S. patent 7,830,874

=== SCM packet ===
SCM messages are 12 bytes. Each message contains single, cumulative meter reading value along with the meter serial number, commodity type and checksum and tamper flags.

| Field | Length (bits) | Default Value | Notes |
|---|---|---|---|
| Sync bit | 1 | 1 | |
| Preamble | 20 | 0xF2A60 | |
| ERT ID MS bits | 2 | | highest two bits of meter serial number |
| Reserved | 1 | | |
| Physical Tamper | 2 | | |
| ERT Type | 4 | | commodity type: water, gas or electric |
| Encoder Tamper | 2 | | |
| Consumption Data | 24 | | meter reading value |
| ERT ID LS bits | 24 | | lower bits of meter serial number |
| Checksum | 16 | | A BCH code with generator polynomial: $p(x) = x^{16} + x^{14} + x^{13} + x^{11} + x^{10} + x^9 + x^8 + x^6 + x^5 + x + 1$ |

=== IDM packet ===
IDM messages are 92 bytes and contain time of use consumption data.

| Field | Length (bytes) | Value | Notes |
|---|---|---|---|
| Training Sync | 2 | 0x5555 | |
| Frame Sync | 2 | 0x16A3 | |
| Packet Type | 1 | 0x1C | |
| Packet Length | 2 | 0x5CC6 | Number of remaining bytes (MSB) and Hamming code of first byte (LSB) |
| Version | 1 | 0x01 | |
| ERT Type | 1 | 0x17 | LSB nibble is equivalent to SCM's ERT Type. |
| ERT Serial Number | 4 | | |
| Consumption Interval Count | 1 | | |
| Module Programming State | 1 | | |
| Tamper Count | 6 | | |
| Async Count | 2 | | |
| Power Outage Flags | 6 | | |
| Last Consumption Count | 4 | | |
| Differential Consumption Intervals | 53 | | 47 intervals of 9-bit integers |
| Transmit Time Offset | 2 | | |
| Serial no. CRC | 2 | | CRC-16-CCITT of ERT Serial Number |
| Packet CRC | 2 | | CRC-16-CCITT of packet starting at Packet Type |

Later patents describe further variations of packets with variable length.

== Implementations ==
Several vendors (besides Itron) have implemented ERT receivers (usually in order to read consumption data from Itron meters.) Notably, Digi sells an ERT gateway, and Grid Insight sells a PC-based product called the AMRUSB-1.

It should be possible to decode ERT signals using general purpose UHF packet radios such as the Texas Instruments CC1101 or Freescale MC33696. A software-defined radio receiver has been implemented using inexpensive hardware: RTLAMR, and the rtl_433 software will decode SCM messages. Kismet (software) has an rtlamr data source.
