= Tcon =

TCON or TCon may refer to:

- The Chronicles of Narnia, a fantasy novel series
- a Truck CONstructed (TCON) or built (trailer closed) for transport from one location to another without opening the trailer at an intermediate cross dock facility used in Less than truckload shipping.
- T-con ("timing controller"), a class of application-specific integrated circuits used in flat panel displays
- The Conduit, a 2009 first-person shooter video game
- Tuguegarao Consortium - The largest ICT and Hacker Conference in Northern Philippines, Conference which organized by HackTheNorth a national non-profit organization from North Luzon, recognized by the ICT Community, whose objective is the professional growth of ICT Enthusiasts.

== See also ==
- Unit load
- Corrugated box design
- Track and trace
- Dimensional weight
