= Open metering system =

Communication standards for smart meters

The open metering system of the Open Metering System Group e.V. stands for a manufacturer- and media-independent standardization for Meter-Bus (M-Bus) based communication between utility meters (electricity, gas, water, thermal energy), submetering (cold/hot water, thermal energy, heat cost allocators), and systems in the field of smart meters.

== Background ==
In response to Directive 2006/32/EC on energy end-use efficiency and energy services of the European Union (in particular Article 13 of the Directive), several German multi-utility-companies (public utility offering more than only one type of supply like electricity, gas, water and district heating) joined and asked international manufacturers of meters intended for billing to create a common standard. The goal was to have meters with standardized communication interfaces and systems in the future. On the manufacturer side, members of the technical associations FIGAWA (German Association for Gas and Water), KNX and ZVEI (German Electrical and Electronics Industry Association) came together and, on the basis of the European Meter-Bus standard (EN 13757 Part 1 to Part 7), and the Dutch NTA 8130, have made joint specifications that guarantee manufacturer-independent interoperability.

== Open Metering System specification ==
Several working groups – first in the Open Metering System initiative, since 2015 within the Open Metering System Group e. V. – have checked the application of existing standards for interoperable communication of measurement systems since May 2007 and developed additions and specifications. For the data transmission defined as primary communication between the actual meters and a gateway (e.g. a Smart Meter Gateway), the EN 13757-x series of standards has been identified as the currently applicable communication standard. This series of standards describes the M-Bus both as a physical interface, wired and wireless, as well as the data protocol. Both the OMS specification and the KNX standard use the EN 13757-4 standard for wireless communication. This means that both measurement data and data from the field of building automation can be transferred via the same system.

Wide area communication is not the focus of the Open Metering System specification. This is solved with proven Internet standards, whereby the transmission should be independent of the physical medium as long as the necessary security mechanisms are observed.

For data visualization (consumer display), the connection of the building automation at the end customer, and for future services (e.g. tariff or load management) devices are used that work according to the popular KNX standard (ISO/IEC 14543-3 = EN 50090).

In the specification work, European concerns were also considered. On the basis of Mandate M/441 of the European Commission, smart metering should function with an open architecture including communication protocols that enable interoperability. For this purpose, the OMS-Group cooperated with KEMA (now DNV) for harmonization with the Dutch regulations NTA 8130/DSMR.

The requirements for data security and access protection were considered as a decisive prerequisite for the acceptance of intelligent metering systems. A device-specific encryption of the consumption data on the basis of common algorithms (AES 128) is part of the OMS specification.

Compliance with the Open Metering System specification can be checked using the OMS test specification and the OMS conformance test tool. The actual proof of OMS conformity is provided by checking the device through an independent testing institute and having issued a certificate by an independent certification body.

== Standardization ==
The outcoming results have been brought into European via the Technical Committee CEN/TC 294 since 2009, which maintains and develops the EN 13757 series of standards. This means that essential components of the OMS specification have been incorporated into updated European Standards. The standards or the published draft standards are available to everyone for purchase. The OMS specification documents are in English and available for free.

== National access status ==
List of local grid operator policies for HAN (Home Area Network) remote reading. This gives an overview how energy savings and efficiency goals can be implemented in practice under local legislation and network operator policies. Energy consumption and savings are also important part of today's home automation integration which are able to visualize statistics in user interfaces.

National access status
country	network	status	meters	method	notes
Belgium		allowed	Sagem Siconia	HAN P1 USB-cable	P1 is by default closed, operator activates it from request.
Estonia	Elektrilevi	disallowed	Landis+Gyr E360, E450		All wires forbidden for security reasons. EU-directive would enforce to open it, but Estonia has not ratified the directive yet.
Finland	Helen, Caruna, LRE	allowed		HAN RJ12	Finnish law requires open standard interface that is used in other EU country, with RJ12 modular connector and ASCII-message format On some networks P1 is closed by default, operator activates it upon request
Denmark	Ørsted				
France	Enedis				
Germany	E.ON				
Lithuania	ESO	allowed		P1 (RJ12)	Closed by default, activated upon request.
Luxemburg		allowed		HAN P1 USB-cable	
Netherlands		allowed		HAN P1 USB-cable	
Norway		allowed		HAN RJ45	
Sweden		allowed		HAN RJ12	
UK	ENW, Northern Powergrid, SSEN, ScottishPower, UKPN				

EU directive 2019/944 says that consumer is entitled to connect own devices to the smart meter and receive metering information in real-time

== See also ==
- DLMS
- Electricity meter – Communication
- OpenHAN
- Power line communication
- Meter-Bus
- Smart meter
