= MBus =

MBus or M-Bus may refer to:

- MBus (SPARC), a computer bus designed for communication between high speed system components
- M-Bus, or Meter-Bus, a bus used for remote reading of gas or electricity meters (EN 13757)
- Message Bus (Mbus), an inter-process communication protocol (RFC 3259)
- Master of Business, a college degree
- MBus (Nokia), a bus used with Nokia mobile phones

== See also ==
- Modbus
