= Dieter W. Bergman =

American electrical engineer (1931–2014)

Dieter W. Bergman (1931–2014) was an American electrical engineer.

== Biography ==
Bergman was born in 1931. His family emigrated to the United States when he was young.

Bergman began his career in 1956 as a designer at Philco Ford in Philadelphia. His work in electronic circuit design led him to participate in meetings of the Institute of Interconnecting and Packaging Electronic Circuits (IPC) in the 1960s.

In 1974, Bergman was appointed as the first technical director of IPC by executive director Ray Pritchard. During his tenure, IPC developed into an influential organization in the realm of technical standards for electronic circuits. Bergman's work included co-authoring standards related to electronic circuit board design, land patterns, and dimensioning. He also co-founded the IPC Designers Council and contributed to IPC's global standards development.

Bergman's contributions to the field were recognized with the IPC President's Award in 1968, and he was inducted into the IPC Hall of Fame in 1985. In 2012, the PCB Design Hall of Fame was named after him by PCD&F.

The Dieter Bergman IPC Fellowship Award at IPC is named after him.

== Awards and recognition ==
- 1968: IPC President's Award
- 1985: IPC Hall of Fame
- 2012: PCB Design Hall of Fame
