= Heat meter =

Measuring device for thermal energy

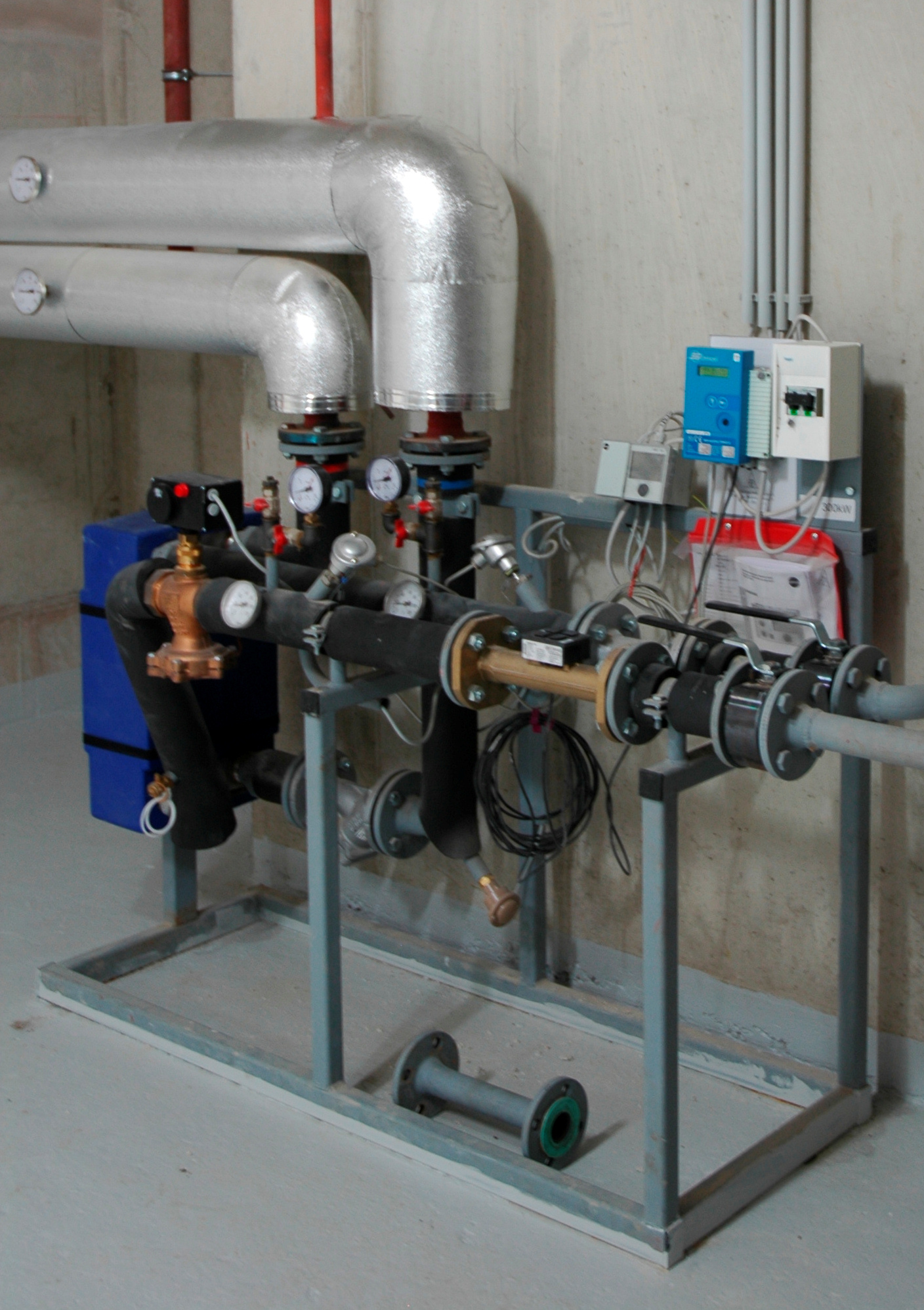
A heat meter attached to a heat exchanger in a district heating substation in a residential neighborhood in Austria. Right in white-blue: the calculator; in the center in bronze: the ultrasonic flow meter.

A heat meter, thermal energy meter, or BTU meter is a device that measures thermal energy provided by a source, such as a central heating system, by measuring the flow rate of the heat transfer fluid and the change in its temperature (ΔT) between the outflow and return legs of the system. Heat meters are used in district heating systems and other shared heating systems to measure heat delivered to residential and commercial tenants, which enables consumption-based billing (submetering). Heat meters are also used in industrial plants for measuring boiler output and heat taken by process.

== Elements ==
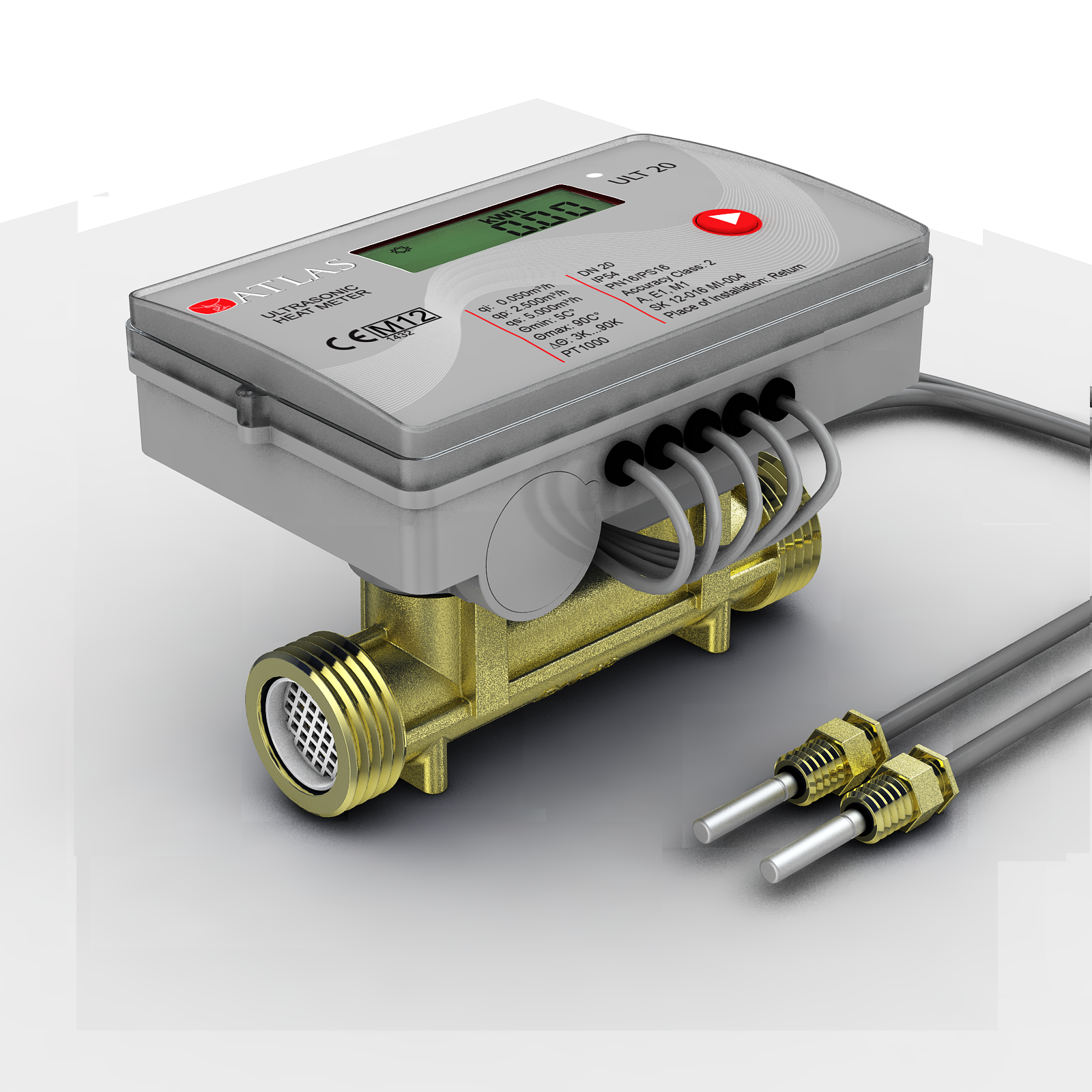
Heat meter with ultrasonic flow meter

A heat meter consists of:

1. A fluid flow meter, typically a turbine flow meter or ultrasonic flow meter.
2. A means of measuring the temperature between the outflow and the inflow, usually a pair of thermocouples.
3. A means of integrating the two measurements over a period of time and accumulating the total heat transfer in a given period.

== Applications ==
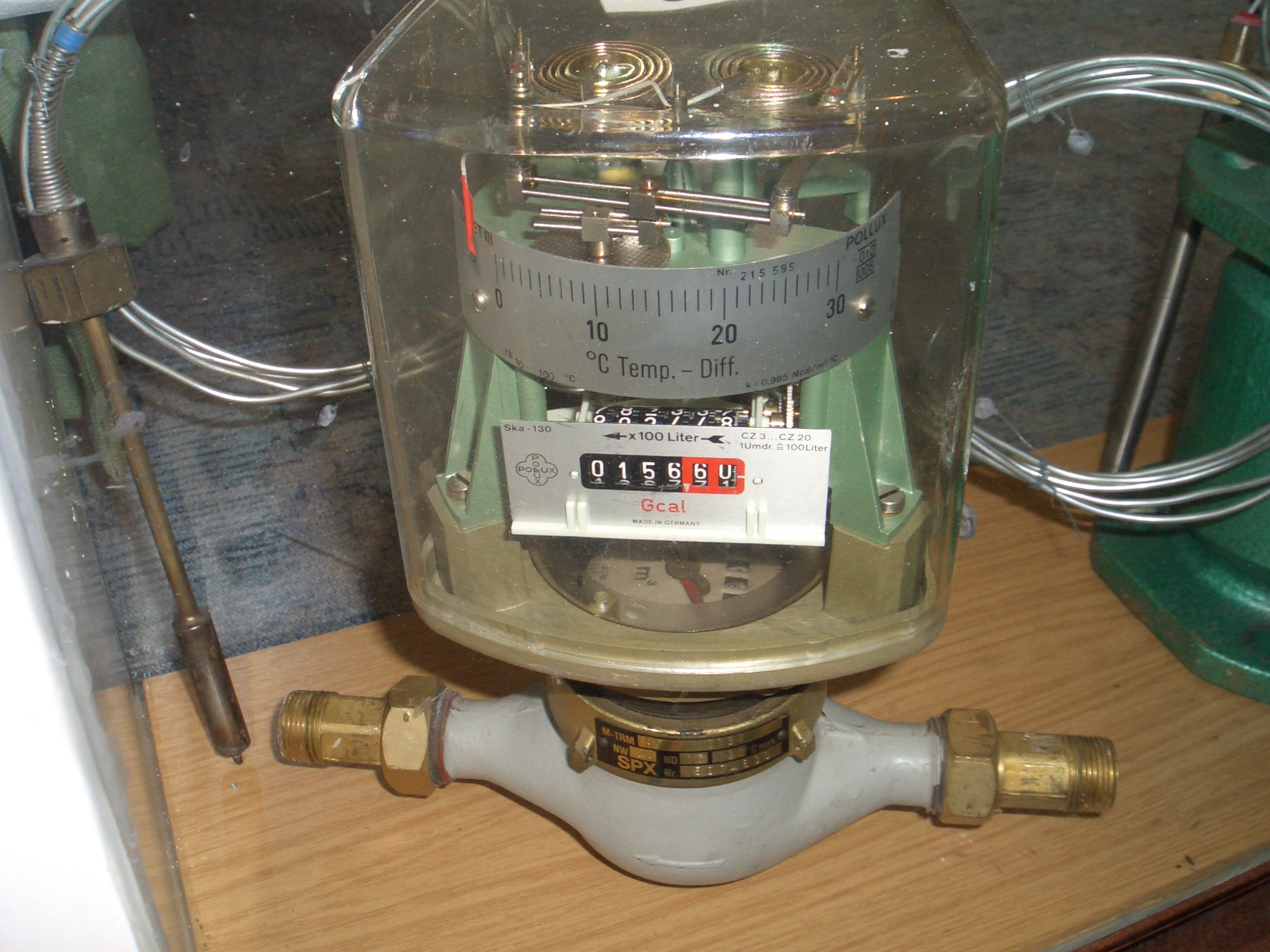
Early mechanical heat meter

Heat meters are commonly used in buildings served by district heating. Operators of multifamily residential buildings and multi-tenant commercial buildings with hydronic systems can also use heat meters to submeter tenant use of the system.

In industrial plants, a thermal energy meter can be used to measure the cooling output from a chiller unit, for example to monitor functionality and energy efficiency.

Heat metering can be used in solar thermal collector systems to verify that the system is working correctly and quantify how much solar heat is collected. For example, an experimental solar water heating project in 1976 in Ocala, Florida, involved using heat meters to measure energy produced by the solar heaters.

== Regional practices and regulations ==
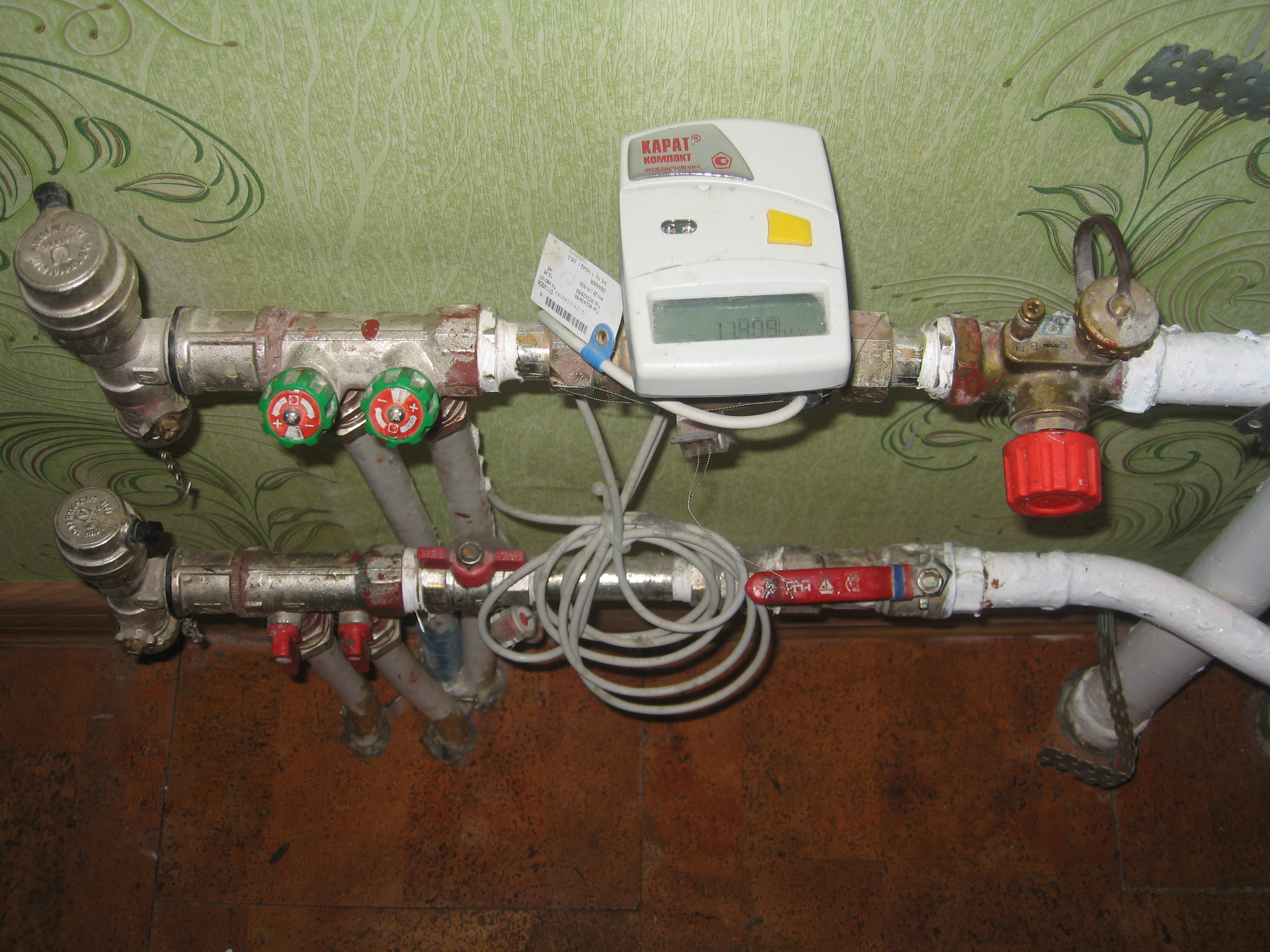
Example of heat meter installation

=== European Union ===
The European Union has encouraged per-tenant heat metering as an energy efficiency strategy since 2002, and it made heat metering mandatory in 2012 with the Energy Efficiency Directive 2012/27/EU. This directive requires heat metering in multifamily residential buildings that use district heating or have a central heating system. For example, the United Kingdom requires operators of communal heating systems to submeter tenant heat use. The goal is to reduce energy consumption by providing tenants a financial incentive to reduce heat consumption.

In the European Union, heat meters need to comply with the Measuring Instruments Directive (MID) Annex VI MI-004 if the meters are used for custody transfer. For automatic meter reading, they use the Meter-Bus standard.

=== United States and Canada ===
Heat meters are typically called BTU meters in the United States and Canada. They were commercially available in the United States as early as 1958, under the brand name Pollux BTU Meter. As of the late 2010s and early 2020s, they are uncommon in the United States and Canada, but there is growing interest due to increasing energy costs and requirements to reduce carbon emissions.

The relevant standard is ASTM E3137/E3137M-18, "Standard Specification for Heat Meter Instrumentation", released in 2018.

=== China ===
Northern China has a significant number of large residential buildings with district heating. As early as 2003, policymakers recommended meter-based heat pricing to improve the efficiency and sustainability of district heating, as part of larger heat reform initiatives. By 2015, 32 million heat meters were installed in buildings in urban areas of northern China. As of 2024, relatively few buildings charged for per-household heat usage based on heat meters, but there was interest in improving the quality and distribution of heat metering.

=== Russia ===
District heating is common in Russia, serving 73% of the population as of 2010. At that time, between 10-25% of private houses and apartments with district heating had heat meters, along with 40% of public buildings.

== See also ==
- Heating system
- Heat cost allocator
- Thermometer
- Water metering
