= Breakbulk cargo =

Shipping goods that are loaded individually

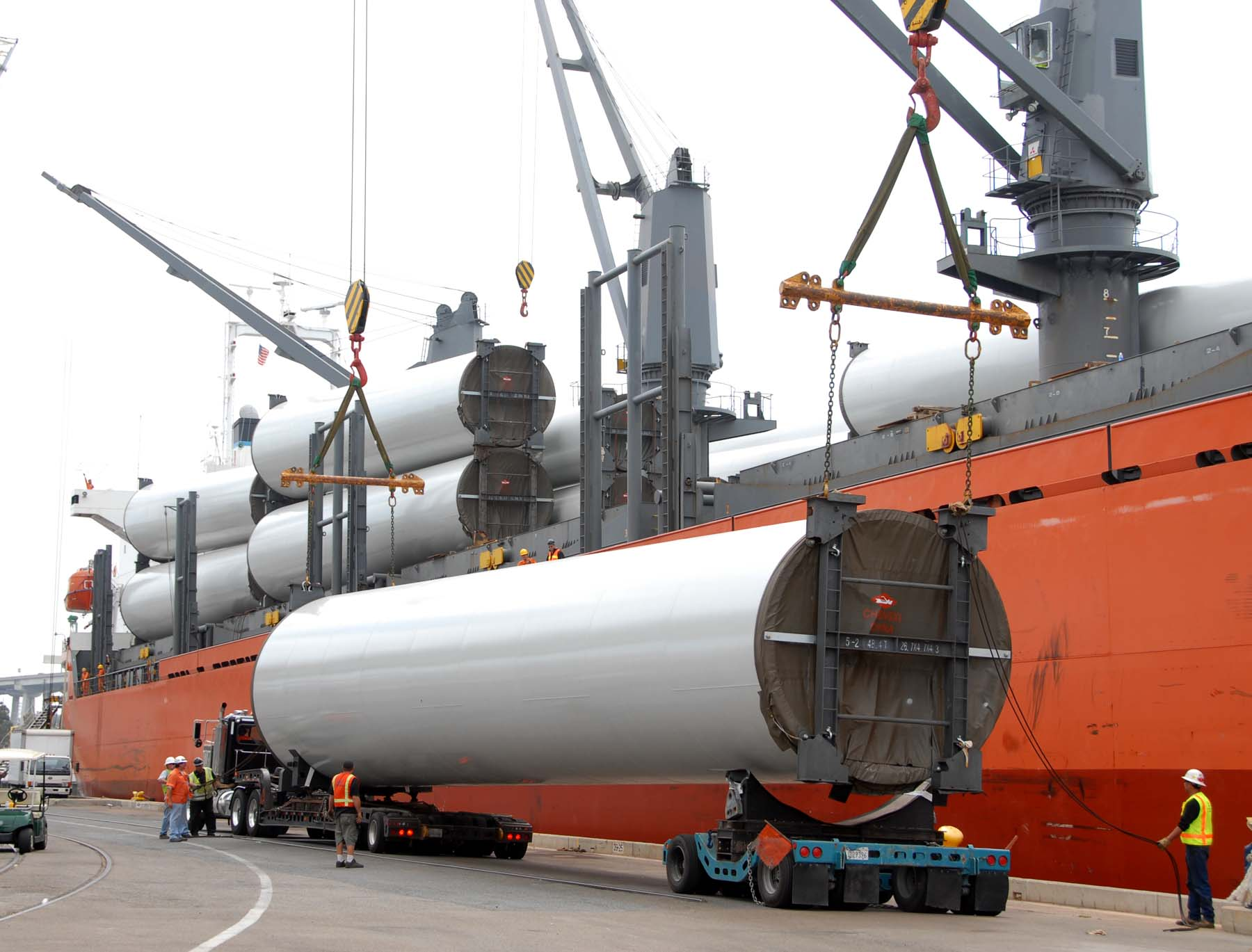
Wind turbine towers being unloaded at a port

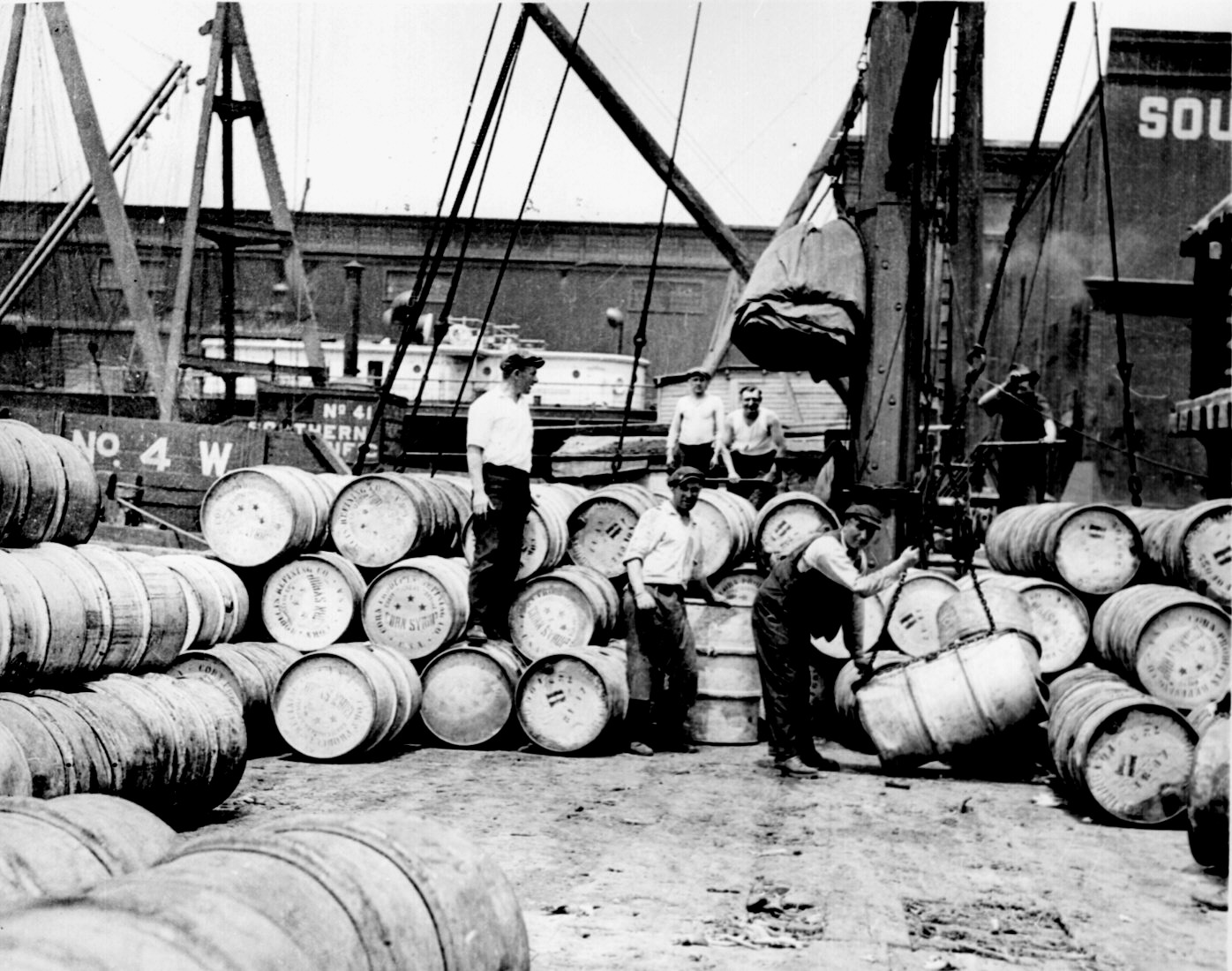
Stevedores on a New York dock loading barrels of corn syrup onto a barge on the Hudson River. Photo by Lewis Hine, c. 1912.

Break-bulk, breakbulk, or break bulk cargo, also called general cargo, are goods that are stowed on board ships in individually counted units. Traditionally, the large numbers of items are recorded on distinct bills of lading that list them by different product. This is in contrast to cargo stowed in modern intermodal containers as well as bulk cargo, which goes directly, unpackaged and in large quantities, into a ship's hold(s), measured by volume or weight (for instance, oil or grain).

The term break-bulk derives from the phrase breaking bulk, a term for unloading part of a ship's cargo, or commencing unloading the cargo. Ships carrying break-bulk cargo are often called general cargo ships.

Break-bulk/general cargo consists of goods transported, stowed and handled piecemeal to some degree, typically bundled somehow in unit loads for hoisting, either with cargo nets, slings, or crates, or stacked on trays, pallets or skids. Furthermore, batches of break-bulk goods are frequently packaged in smaller containers: bags, boxes, cartons, crates, drums, or barrels/vats.

Ideally, break-bulk cargo is lifted directly into and out of a vessel's holds, and this is mostly the case today. Otherwise, it must be lifted onto and off its deck, by cranes or derricks present on the dock or on the ship itself. If hoisted on deck rather than straight into the hold, liftable or rollable goods then have to be man-handled and stowed competently by stevedores. Securing break-bulk and general freight inside a vessel includes the use of dunnage. When no hoisting equipment is available, break bulk has traditionally been manually carried on and off ship, over a plank, or it might be passed from man to man via a human chain.

Since the 1960s, the volume of break-bulk cargo has enormously declined worldwide in favor of mass adoption of intermodal containers.

== Description ==
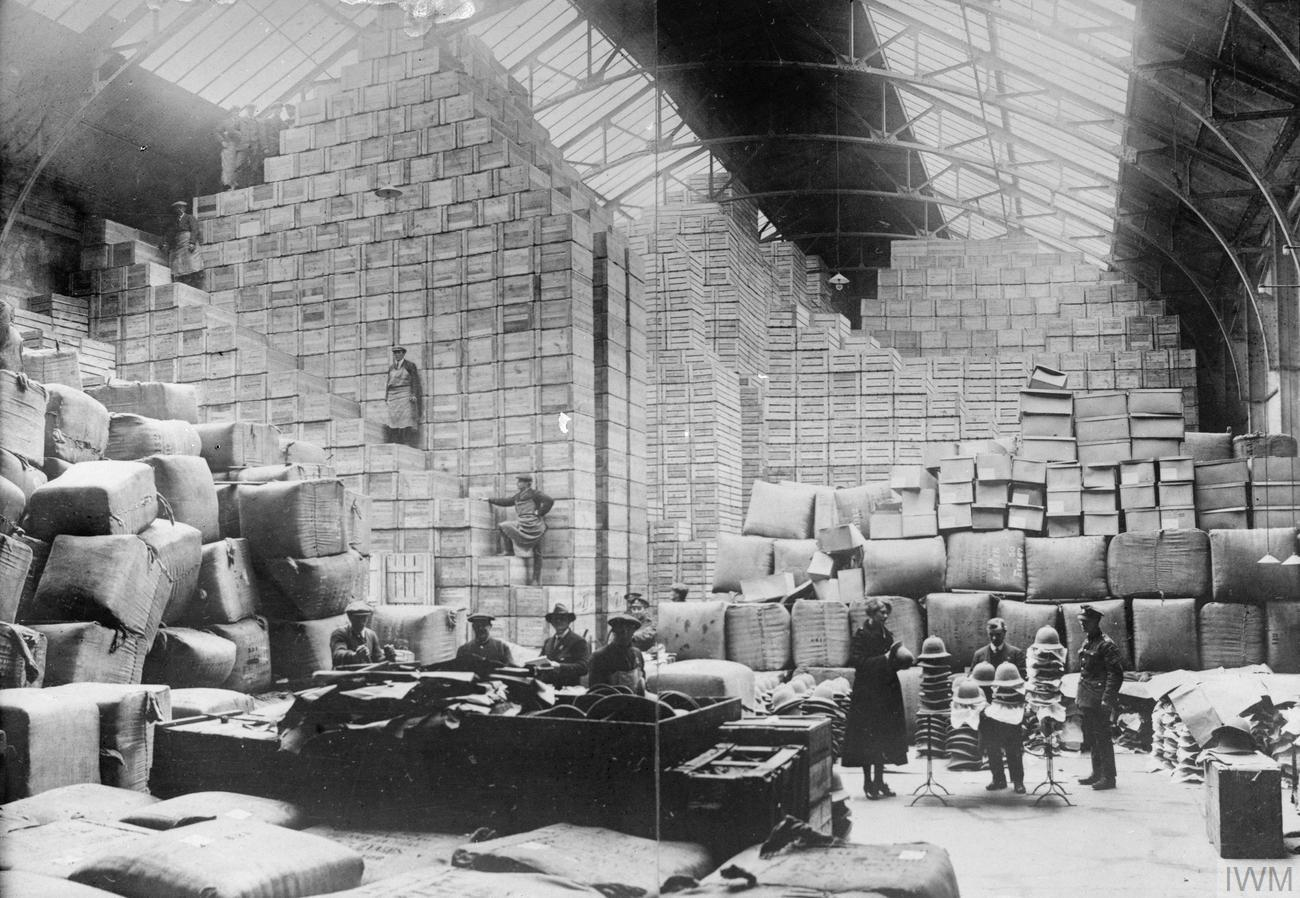
The interior of a London warehouse during World War I, prior to the adoption of pallets and forklifts

The term break-bulk derives from the phrase breaking bulk—using "to break bulk" as a verb—to initiate the extraction of a portion of the cargo of a ship, or to begin the unloading process from the ship's hold(s). Break-bulk cargo is not in shipping containers—neither standard nor non-standard—instead the goods are transported, packaged in smaller containers, like bags, boxes, crates, drums, or barrels. Unit loads of items secured to a pallet or skid are also used.

A break-in-bulk point is a place where goods are transferred from one mode of transport to another, for example the docks where goods transfer from ship to truck.

Break-bulk was the most common form of cargo for most of the history of shipping. Since the late 1960s, the volume of break-bulk cargo has declined dramatically, relative to containerized cargo, while the latter has grown exponentially worldwide. Containerizing makes cargo effectively more homogenous, like other bulk cargoes, and enables the same economies of scale. Moving cargo on and off ship in containers is much more efficient, allowing ships to spend less time in port. Containerization, once widely accepted, reduced shipping and loading costs by 80% to 90%. Break-bulk cargo also suffered from greater theft and damage.

== Loading and unloading ==
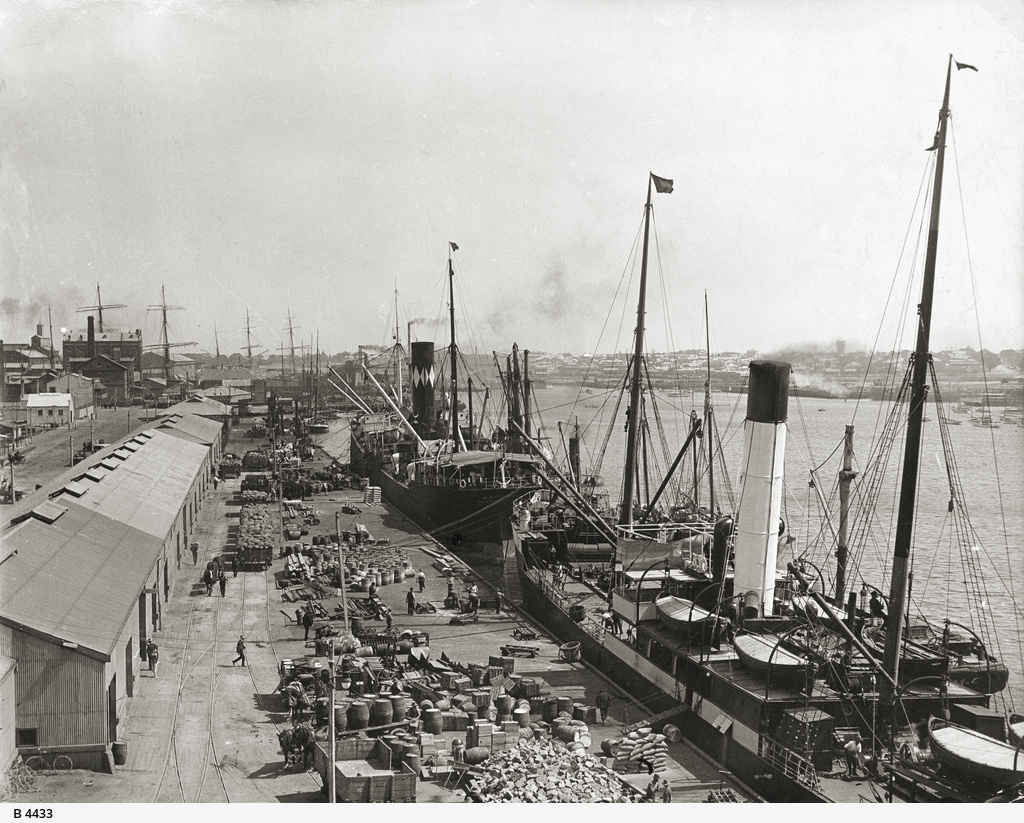
Mixed cargo being loaded into ships at Port Adelaide, c. 1927

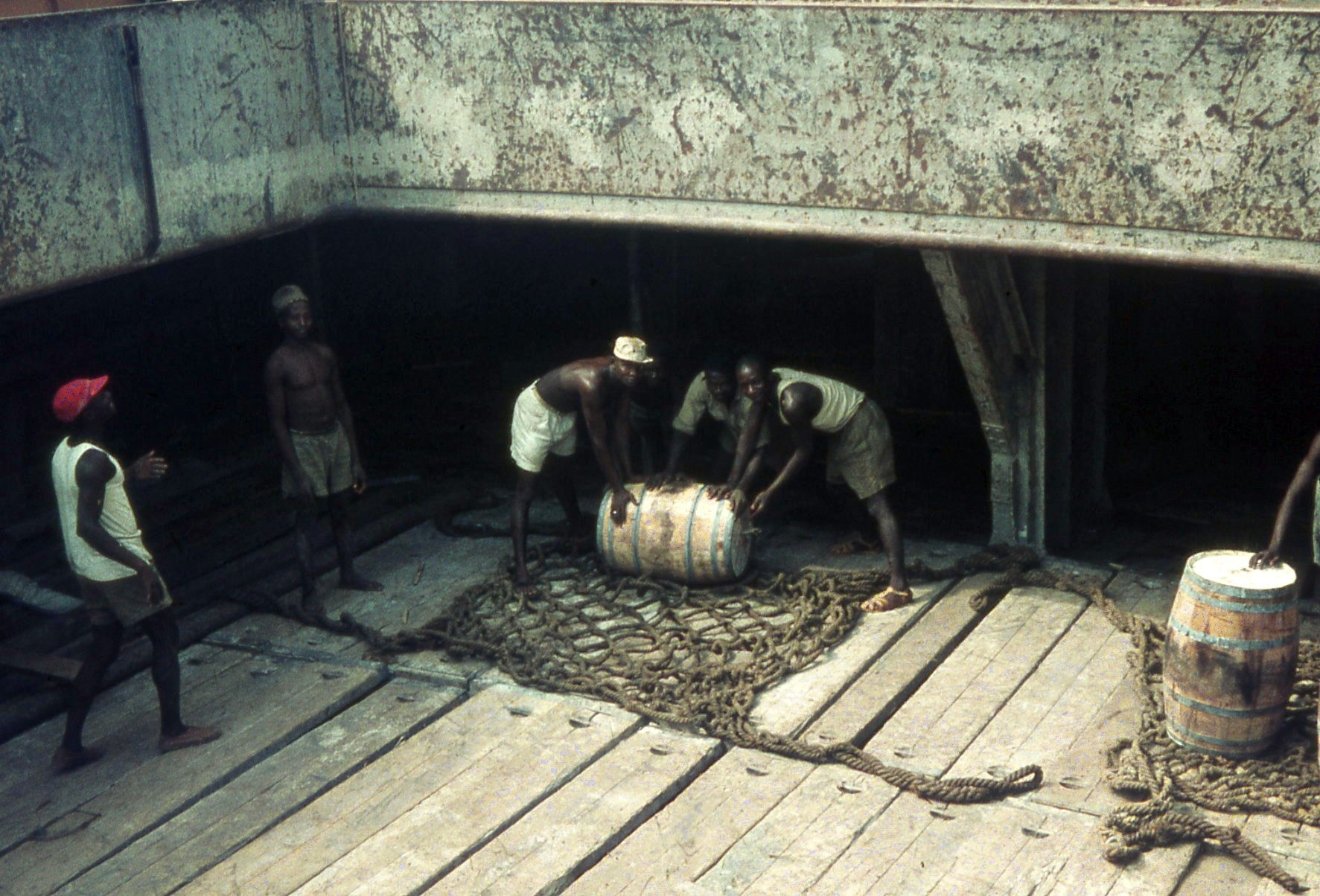
Unloading barrels from a ship, Accra, c. 1958

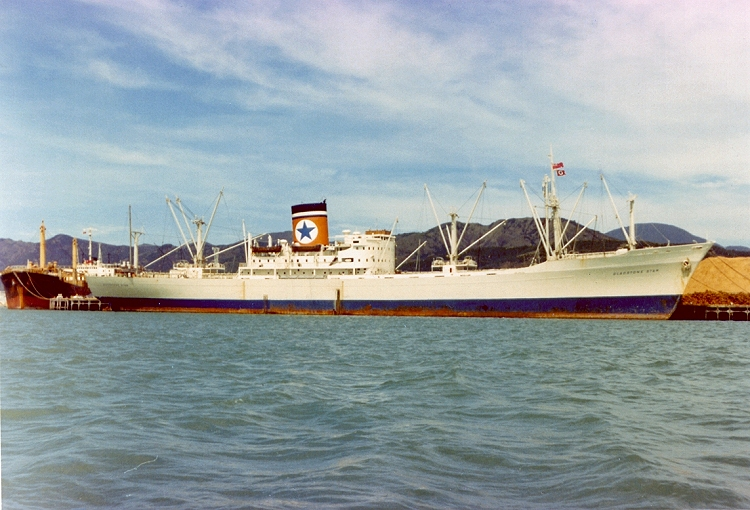
A refrigerated general cargo ship, the Gladstone Star was built in 1957 and scrapped in 1982.

Although cargo of this sort can be delivered straight from a truck or train onto a ship, the most common way is for the cargo to be delivered to the dock in advance of the arrival of the ship and for the cargo to be stored in warehouses. When the ship arrives the cargo is then taken from the warehouse to the quay and then lifted on board by either the ship's gear (derricks or cranes) or by the dockside cranes. The discharge of the ship is the reverse of the loading operation.

Loading and discharging by breakbulk is labour-intensive. The cargo is brought to the quay next to the ship and then each individual item is lifted on board separately. Some items such as sacks or bags can be loaded in batches by using a sling or cargo net and others such as cartons can be loaded onto trays before being lifted on board. Once on board each item must be stowed separately.

Before any loading takes place, any signs of the previous cargo are removed. The holds are swept, washed if necessary and any damage to them repaired. Dunnage is laid ready for the cargo or is just put in bundles ready for the stevedores to lay out as the cargo is loaded.

There are a great many kinds of breakbulk cargo. Examples of the more common types follow below.

=== Bagged cargo ===
Bagged cargo (e.g. coffee in sacks) is stowed on double dunnage and kept clear of the ship's sides and bulk heads. Bags are kept away from pillars and stanchions by covering it with matting or waterproof paper.

=== Baled goods ===
Baled goods are stowed on single dunnage at least 50 mm (2 in) thick. The bales must be clean with all the bands intact. Stained or oily bales are rejected. All fibres can absorb oil and are liable to spontaneous combustion. As a result, they are kept clear of any new paintwork. Bales close to the deckhead are covered to prevent damage by dripping sweat.

=== Barrels and casks ===
Wooden barrels are stowed on their sides on "beds" of dunnage which keeps the middle of the side (the bilge) off the deck and they are stowed with the bung at the top. To prevent movement, wedges called quoins are put in on top of the "beds". Barrels should be stowed fore and aft and not athwart ships. Once the first tier has been loaded, the next tier of barrels fits into the hollows between the barrels; this is known as stowing "bilge and cantline". Barrels which are also known as casks or tuns are primarily used for transporting liquids such as wine, water, brandy, whiskey, and even oil. They are usually built in a spherical shape to make them easier to roll and have less friction when changing direction.

=== Corrugated boxes ===
Corrugated boxes are stowed on a good layer of dunnage and kept clear of any moisture. Military and weather-resistant grades of corrugated fiberboard are available. They are not overstowed with anything other than similar boxes. They are frequently loaded on pallets to form a unit load; if so the slings that are used to load the cargo are frequently left on to facilitate discharge.

=== Wooden shipping containers ===
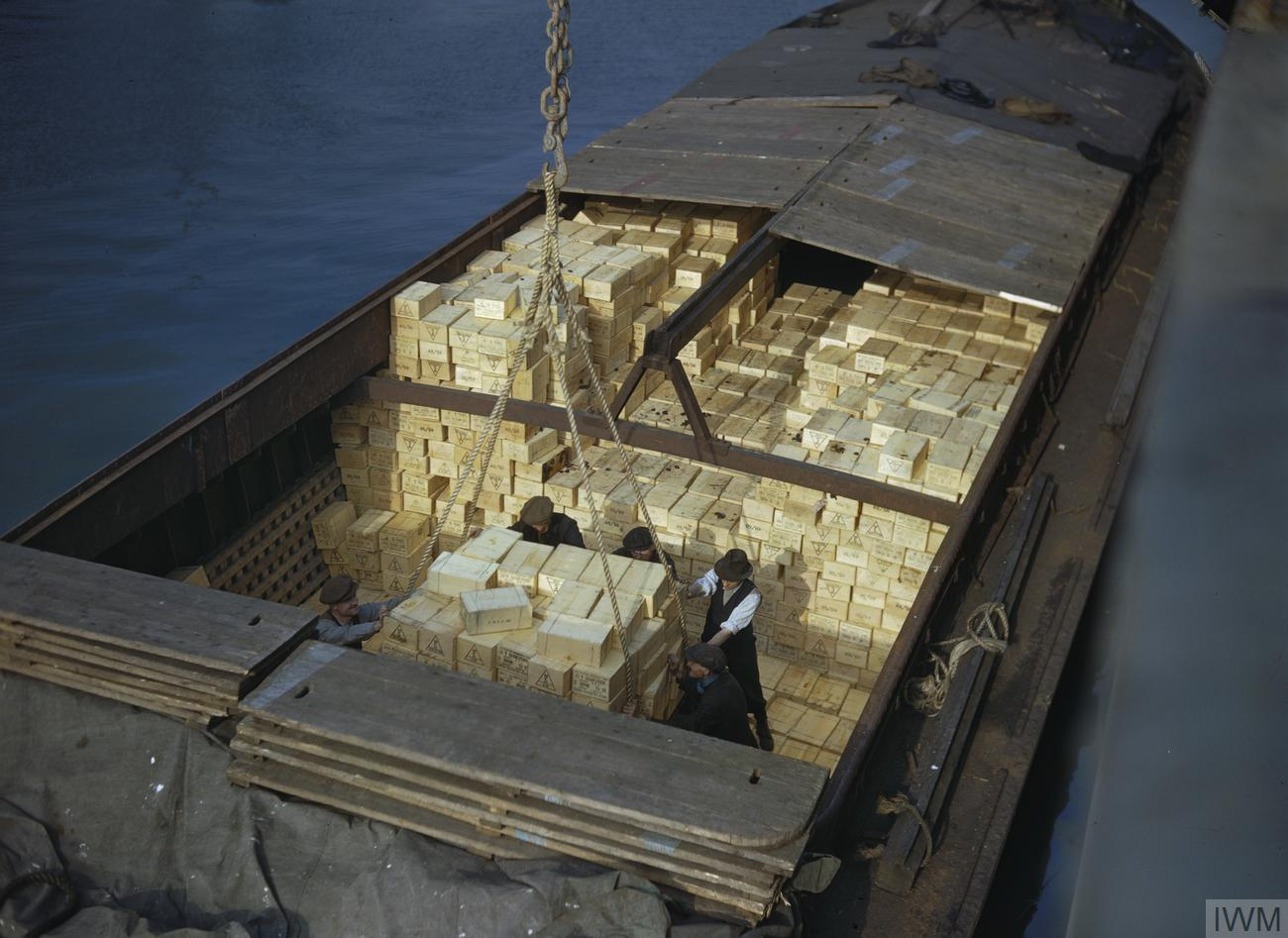
Boxes of dried California peaches being unloaded onto a barge in Britain, 1943

Wooden boxes or crates are stowed on double dunnage in the holds and single dunnage in the 'tween decks. Heavy boxes are given bottom stowage. The loading slings are often left on to aid discharge.

=== Drums ===
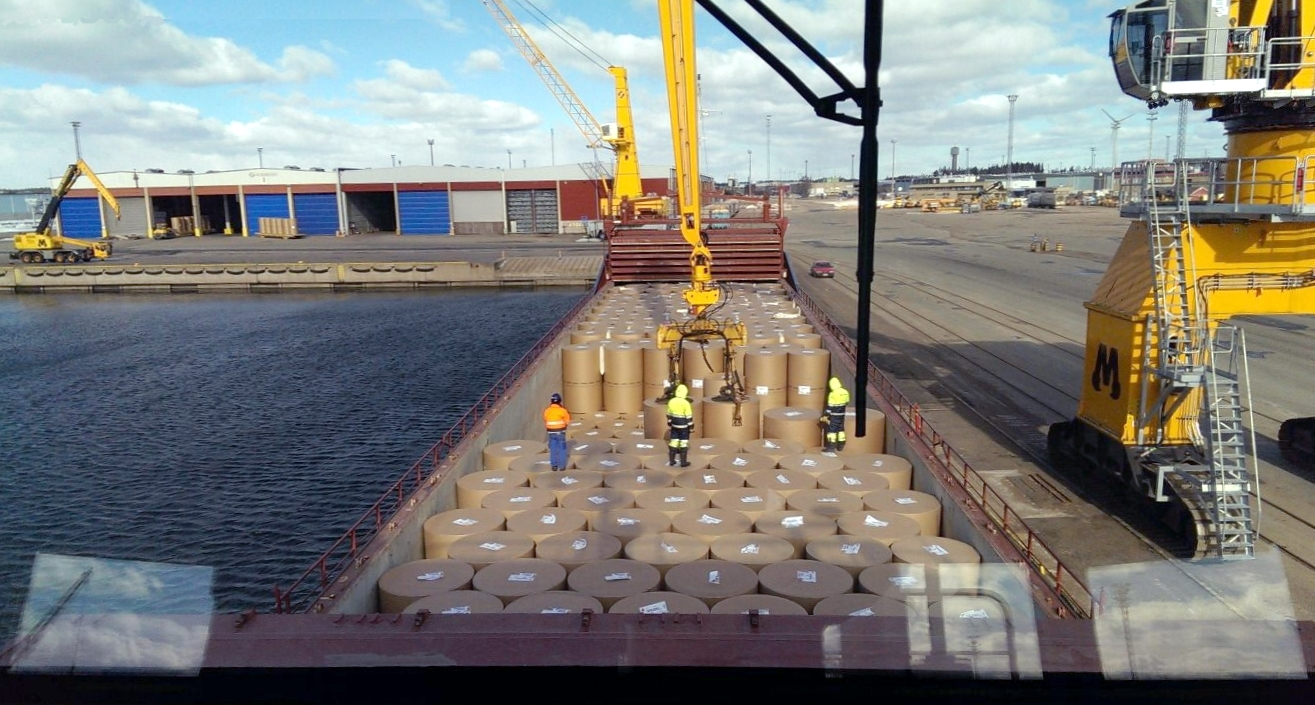
Loading paper rolls in the port of Hamina (Finland) March 2016

Metal drums are stowed on end with dunnage between tiers, in the longitudinal space of the ship.

=== Paper reels ===
Reels or rolls are generally stowed on their sides and care is taken to make sure they are not crushed.

=== Motor vehicles ===
Automobiles are lifted on board and then secured using lashings. Great care is taken to prevent damage. Vehicles are prepared by removing hazardous liquids (gasoline, etc.). This is in contrast to ro-ro (roll-on/roll-off) vessels where vehicles are driven on and off the ship under their own power.

=== Rolled Steel ===
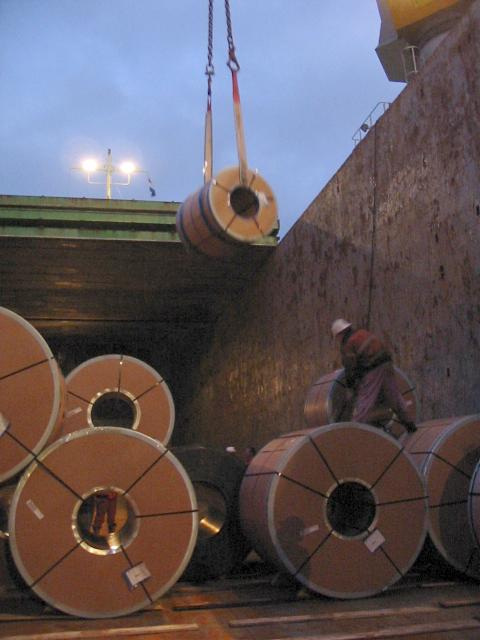
Cold rolled steel loaded on ship

Rolled steel is stored with their axis facing forward and aft.

=== Steel girders ===
Any long heavy items are stowed fore and aft. If they are stowed athwart ships they are liable to shift if the ship rolls heavily, and could pierce through the side of the ship.

== Advantages and disadvantages ==
The biggest disadvantage with breakbulk is that it requires more resources at the wharves at both ends of a ship's journey—longshoremen, loading cranes, warehouses, transport vehicles—and often takes up more dock space due to multiple vessels carrying multiple loads of breakbulk cargo. Indeed, the decline of breakbulk did not start with containerisation; rather, the advent of tankers and bulk carriers reduced the need for transporting liquids in barrels and grains in sacks. Such tankers and carriers use specialised ships and shore facilities to deliver larger amounts of cargo to the dock and effect faster turnarounds with fewer personnel once the ship arrives; however, they do require large initial investments in ships, machinery, and training, slowing their spread to areas where funds to overhaul port operations and/or training for dock personnel in the handling of cargo on the newer vessels may not be available. As modernization of ports and shipping fleets spreads across the world, the advantages of using containerization and specialized ships over break-bulk has sped the overall decline of break-bulk operations around the world. In all, the new systems have reduced costs as well as spillage and turnaround times; in the case of containerisation, damage and theft as well.

Breakbulk continues to hold an advantage in areas where port development has not kept pace with shipping technology; break-bulk shipping requires relatively minimal shore facilities—a wharf for the ship to tie to, dock workers to assist in unloading, warehouses to store materials for later reloading onto other forms of transport. As a result, there are still some areas where break-bulk shipping continues to thrive. Goods shipped break-bulk can also be offloaded onto smaller vessels and lighters for transport into even the most minimally-developed port which the normally large container ships, tankers, and bulk carriers might not be able to access due to size and/or water depth. In addition, some ports capable of accepting larger container ships/tankers/bulk transporters still require goods to be offloaded in break-bulk fashion; for example, in the outlying islands of Tuvalu, fuel oil for the power stations is delivered in bulk but has to be offloaded in barrels.
