= Brunata =

Brunata A/S
- Company type: Private company
- Industry: Energy metering, building data services, IoT
- Founded: 1917
- Founder: Constantin Brun
- Headquarters: Herlev, Denmark
- Key people: Jesper Holm Kristoffersen (CEO, Denmark); Kristian Voldby Olsen (CEO, International)
- Products: Heat cost allocators, water and heat meters, remote metering systems, digital building monitoring
- Parent: Minol-Zenner-Group
- Website: brunata.com

Brunata A/S is a company based in Herlev, Denmark, that operates in the field of energy metering, consumption-based billing, and building-related data services, including heat cost allocators. It describes itself as a clean technology company. Brunata is part of the Minol–Zenner-Group.

== History ==
Brunata was founded in Denmark in 1917. Its early activities included the development of systems for allocating heating costs in residential buildings, which led to the establishment of the company Constantin Brun A/S.

In 1950, Constantin Brun A/S merged with the Swiss company ATA. The new company was named Brunata, combining elements of both original names. During the following decades, Brunata expanded its services, issued licences and in the mid-1990s, the company introduced its first wireless meters, allowing for remote reading.

Starting in 2005, Brunata began the digitalisation of its consumption accounts, enabling residents and property administrators to access consumption data online. In 2018, Brunata was acquired by the German family-owned company Minol. Since then, it has been part of the Minol-Zenner-Group. The takeover made the Group the third-largest heating services provider and heating cost biller in Europe. The Swiss division of Brunata merged with another company, IGS Dienstleistungen, in 2021.

In 2002, the German Federal Cartel Office prevented Viterra Energy Services AG from acquiring Brunata and Minol due to concerns about formation of a monopoly. In 2013, the Bulgarian Commission on Protection of Competition investigated Brunata and other companies for potential coordination on prices. In 2017, the Romanian Competition Council fined Brunata and two other companies for forming a cartel in their market. In 2017 and 2019, Germany did further analyses and investigations of the submetering service sector due to concerns about market concentration.

== Company structure ==
Brunata is part of the Minol-Zenner-Group, a corporate group active in the field of metering and building-related digital services. The group is present in multiple European countries and other international markets.

== Activities ==
Brunata develops and operates systems for the collection and processing of consumption data in buildings, including heating and water meters. These services are used in residential and commercial properties and are applied by housing companies, energy suppliers, municipalities, and industrial clients. As part of its infrastructure, the company uses a network based on wireless communication technology to support the integration of connected devices in buildings. In addition, Brunata is active in the field of Internet of Things (IoT), providing metering and sensor technology, wireless data transmission infrastructure, and platforms for data processing and management to enable smart monitoring and use of building data.
