= Measuring Instruments Directive =

2004 European Union directive

Directive 2014/32/EU
- European Union directive
- Title: Measuring Instruments Directive
- Made by: European Parliament & Council
- Made under: Article 95 (now Article 114)
- Journal reference: L135, 30 April 2004, pp. 1–80

History
- Date made: 31 March 2004
- Entry into force: 30 April 2004
- Implementation date: 30 October 2006

The Measuring Instruments Directive 2014/32/EU, formerly 2004/22/EC, is a directive by the European Union that seeks to harmonise many aspects of legal metrology across all member states of the EU. Its most prominent tenet is that all kinds of meters which receive a MID approval may be used in all countries across the EU.

== Measuring Instruments Directive 2004/22/EC ==
The MID covers these measuring instruments:

- Water meters
- Gas meters and volume conversion devices
- Active electrical energy meters
- Heat meters
- Measuring systems for the continuous and dynamic measurement of quantities of liquids other than water
- Automatic weighing instruments
- Taximeters
- Material measures
- Dimensioning systems
- Exhaust gas analysers

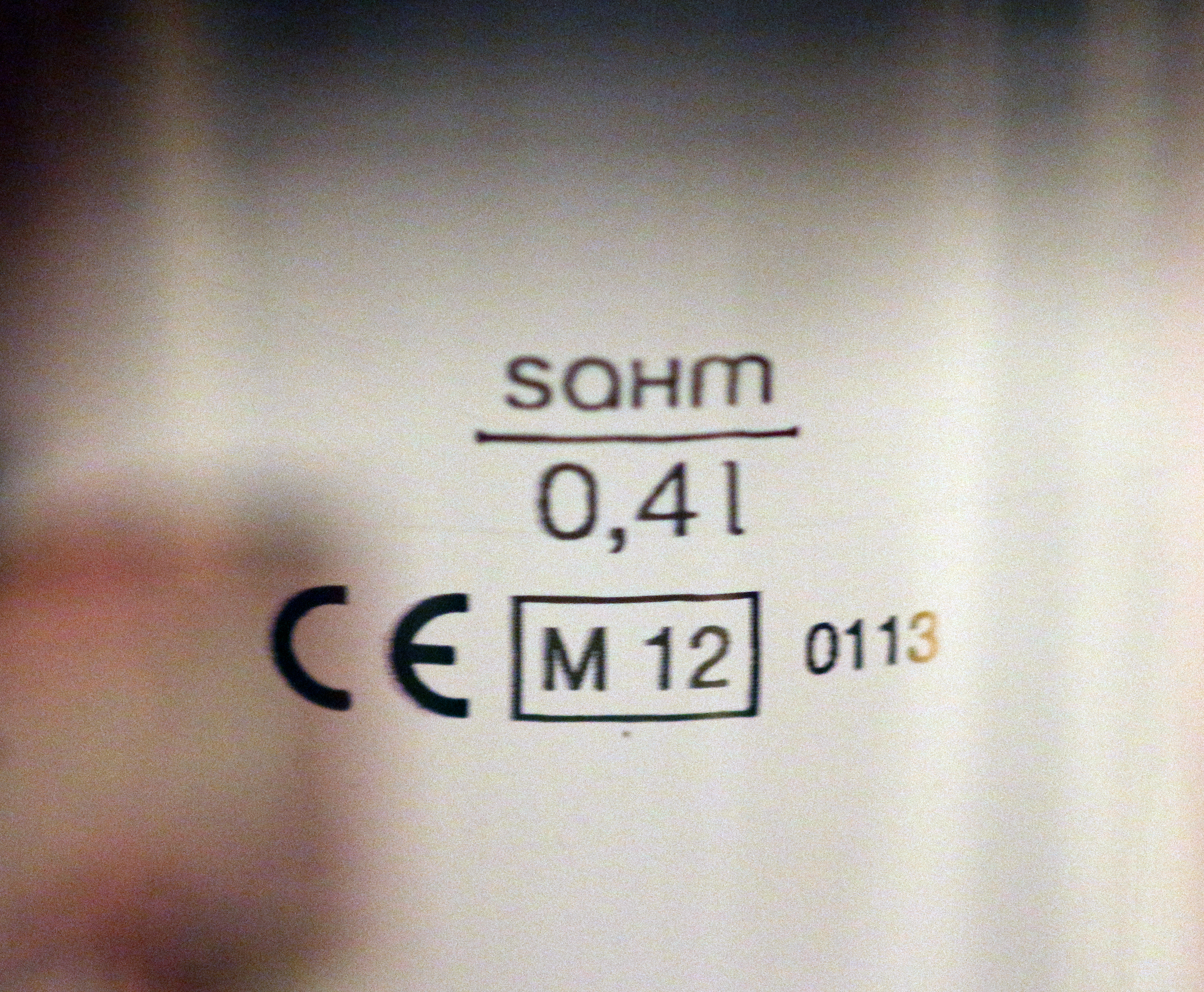
A beer glass with a fill line in compliance with the MID

Measuring instruments that comply with the MID bear:

- The CE mark
- A capital letter "M" and the last two digits of the year of its affixing, surrounded by a rectangle
- The identification number of the notified body involved in conformity assessment

The Measuring Instruments Directive was published on 30 April 2004 in the Official Journal of the EU, but not applied until after 30 October 2006. The directive included a 10-year transition period.

Two amendments to the Directive were published:

- Commission Directive 2009/137/EC of 10 November 2009 Amending Directive 2004/22/EC of the European Parliament and of the council on measuring instruments in respect of exploitation of the maximum permissible errors, as regards the instrument-specific annexes MI-001 to MI-005
- Directive 2014/32/EU of the European Parliament and of the Council of 26 February 2014 on the harmonisation of the laws of the Member States relating to the making available on the market of measuring instruments

== See also ==
- WELMEC
