= Open Automated Demand Response =

Energy management standard

Open Automated Demand Response (OpenADR) is a research and standards development effort for automated demand response and energy management led by North American research labs and companies. The typical use is to send information and signals to cause electrical power-using devices to be turned off during periods of high demand.

In its early phases, the OpenADR research was initiated by Demand Response Research Center (DRRC) which is managed by Lawrence Berkeley National Laboratory (LBNL). The specification was released in April 2009. By contrast, the related OpenHAN standard for home area networks was promoted by utilities themselves and is an attempt to reconcile various home control technologies including X10, Insteon, P1901 and HomePlug.

An Open Automated Demand Response (OpenADR) outreach collaborative was eventually formed in October 2010 and a related OpenADR Alliance "to accelerate the development, adoption and compliance of OpenADR standards throughout the energy industry" and "provide common language" for smart meters. The effort sought publicity for its attempt to unify smart grid plans under a common standards umbrella to form a viable cleantech industry with a relatively level playing field. As NIST and NERC were committed to the OpenADR approach all along and the National Broadband Plan (United States) required (in its "goal 6") open access to consumer power use data by ADR providers, there was probably little doubt of the standards influence.

== History ==
The 2000–2001 California electricity crisis served as the impetus for the effort that ultimately led to the creation of version 1.0 of the OpenADR standard. The Demand Response Research Center, which is operated by Lawrence Berkeley National Laboratory (LBNL), created the standard with funding from the California Energy Commission's Public Interest Energy Research (PIER) program.

Shortly after 2002, the DRRC worked with the California IOUs (SCE, SDG&E and PG&E) to jointly develop this technology through pilots and actual program implementations. In 2009, OpenADR was included in the Smart Grid Interoperability Standards Framework, and Federal Energy Regulatory Commission (FERC) identified OpenADR as a key standard for Demand Response. Additional standards work was performed by the Smart Grid Interoperability Panel (SGIP), which is being tasked by the U.S. National Institute of Standards and Technology (NIST) to oversee standardization of the Smart Grid. The North American Energy Standards Board contributed to the effort by developing a set of requirements.

In that same year, the OpenADR specification was released as an official California Energy Commission (CEC) document, and the DRRC donated version 1.0 of the OpenADR standard to the Organization for the Advancement of Structured Information Standards and the Utilities Communication Architecture (UCA) International Users Group. The work to create version 2.0 of the OpenADR standard is being performed by OASIS through its Energy Interoperation (EI) Technical Committee with assistance from the UCAIug OpenADR Taskforce. Once work is completed on OpenADR version 2.0, with its expanded and complete set of DR and distributed energy resources (DER) signals, the standard will be submitted to the International Electrotechnical Commission (IEC) in Geneva, Switzerland for adoption worldwide. IEC is the world's leading organization for international standards for all electrical, electronic and related technologies.

== Mechanism ==
In the Open Automated Demand Response Communications Specification (Version 1.0), LBNL describes OpenADR as:

“a communications data model designed to facilitate sending and receiving DR signals from a utility or independent system operator to electric customers. The intention of the data model is to interact with building and industrial control systems that are pre‐programmed to take action based on a DR signal, enabling a demand response event to be fully automated, with no manual intervention. The OpenADR specification is a highly flexible infrastructure design to facilitate common information exchange between a utility or Independent System Operator (ISO) and their end‐use participants. The concept of an open specification is intended to allow anyone to implement the signaling systems, providing the automation server or the automation clients.”

The specification also describes the scope of the OpenADR standard:

“The Open Automated Demand Response Communications Specification defines the interface to the functions and features of a Demand Response Automation Server (DRAS) that is used to facilitate the automation of customer response to various Demand Response programs and dynamic pricing through a communicating client. This specification, referred to as OpenADR, also addresses how third parties such as utilities, ISOs, energy and facility managers, aggregators, and hardware and software manufacturers will interface to and utilize the functions of the DRAS in order to automate various aspects of demand response (DR) programs and dynamic pricing.”

During a Demand Response event, the utility or ISO/RTO provides information to the DRAS about what has changed and on what schedule, such as start and stop times. A typical change would specify one or more of the following:

- PRICE_ABSOLUTE – The price per kilowatt‐hour
- PRICE_RELATIVE – A change in the price per kilowatt‐hour
- PRICE_MULTIPLE – A multiple of a basic rate per kilowatt‐hour
- LOAD_AMOUNT – A fixed amount of load to shed or shift
- LOAD_PERCENTAGE – The percentage of load to shed or shift

Note that in the first three cases, it would be up to the customer to determine how best to participate in the OpenADR event. For example, commercial customers might be notified of a change in Time‐of‐Use pricing during a peak period, and the Energy Management System (EMS) might be programmed to temporarily offset building temperatures by several degrees and dim or turn‐off non‐essential lights. The last two cases normally shed load automatically based on an existing arrangement. If prices continue to climb higher the EMS may escalate the DR program by reducing or turning off rooftop air handlers during the same peak period. The standard also specifies considerable additional information that can be exchanged related to DR and DER events, including event name and identification, event status, operating mode, various enumerations (a fixed set of values characterizing the event), reliability and emergency signals, renewable generation status, market participation data (such as bids), test signals, and more.

== Relationship with other standards ==
In development of OpenADR, the OASIS Energy Interoperation Technical Committee is working with both the OASIS Energy Market Information Exchange (EMIX) and the OASIS Web Services Calendar (WS‐Calendar) Technical Committees to coordinate development of the full set of standards needed to exchange pricing information using a common schedule across energy markets. EMIX defines a standard way to exchange pricing and other information among ISOs and utilities. Because the price of electricity varies with the time of delivery, EMIX conveys the necessary time and interval data using WS‐Calendar as a common clock. Both EMIX (Common Price Communication Model) and WS‐ Calendar (Common Scheduling Mechanism) take advantage of the SGIP Priority Action Plan (PAP) assessment and recognition process.

OpenADR also interacts, although less directly, with the NAESB Energy Usage Information Model and the ASHRAE Facility Smart Grid Information Model. The Energy Usage Information Model supports load curtailment, load shaping and energy market operations, all of which pertain to Demand Response. The Facility Smart Grid Information Model will create a standardized data exchange that enables control systems in the customer premises to manage electrical loads and generation sources in response to communications from utilities, and other electrical service providers or market operators. OpenADR will also need to interoperate directly or interwork indirectly with other popular protocols now used for energy management, including BACnet, LonMark and the Smart Energy Profile ZigBee. Depending on the protocol, this is expected to be accomplished either with enhancements to these standards, or with separate software or systems, such as a gateway function capable of translating between protocols.

== OpenADR Alliance ==
The OpenADR Alliance is composed of industry stakeholders that are interested in fostering and accelerating the development and adoption of OpenADR standards and compliance with those standards. This extends to de facto standards based on specifications published by LBNL in April 2009, as well as Smart Grid-related standards emerging from OASIS, UCA, NAESB (North American Energy Standards Board), and ASHRAE (American Society of Heating, Refrigeration, and Air‐Conditioning Engineers).

The OpenADR Alliance was formed to build on the foundation of technical activities to support the development, testing, and deployment of commercial OpenADR and facilitates its acceleration and widespread adoption. This approach needs to engage service providers (such as electric utilities and systems operators) within the domain of the Smart Grid that publish OpenADR signals, as well as the facilities or third-party entities that consume them to manage electric loads. The OpenADR Alliance will enable all stakeholders to participate in automated DR, dynamic pricing, and electricity grid reliability.

The OpenADR Alliance activities will include, but not be limited to, the following:

- Develop a conformance, certification, and testing process/program for OpenADR, coordinated with entities such as standard development organizations (SDOs), user groups, and Smart Grid activities.
- Collaborate with SDOs and user groups for the continued enhancements of the OpenADR standard.
- Collaborate with the U.S. Department of Energy (DOE), Federal Energy Regulatory Commission (FERC), National Association of Regulatory Utility Commissioners (NARUC), and other government agencies to expand the adoption of OpenADR.
- Collaborate with other alliances and organizations on global partnership opportunities.
- Develop an OpenADR marketing portal targeted to customers that may be interested in participating in an automated DR program. Members can use this portal to promote their offerings and direct interested parties to their own web sites for information.
- Conduct and provide education and training sessions for system integrators, control vendors, and others to enable them to install "OpenADR-ready" equipment within facilities to receive OpenADR signals; and customers to help them develop load management strategies.
- Establish centralized development and documentation related to OpenADR deployments, including lessons learned from previous deployments and the development of best practices.
- Develop programs to allow vendors to develop, test, and demonstrate their ability to integrate with OpenADR signals.

The mission of the OpenADR Alliance is to foster the development, adoption and compliance of the OpenADR standards through collaboration, education, training, testing and certification. The Alliance will also promote the worldwide market acceptance of the OpenADR standard. Work being performed by industry coalitions like the OpenADR Alliance is critical to the success of new Smart Grid standards. No new standard is ever 100% complete, and different interpretations can cause interoperability problems in early implementations. For this reason, the Alliance is supported by a broad cross section of utilities, independent system operators, regional transmission operators, regulators and vendors who share a common interest in the success and widespread adoption of the OpenADR standard. In performing its work, the Alliance will adhere to industry best practices as detailed in the Interoperability Process Reference Manual (IPRM) created by the SGIP Testing and Certification Committee (www.sgip.org). The IPRM outlines the conformance, interoperability and cyber‐security testing and certification requirements for Smart Grid standards recommended by the SGIP.
