= Dimensioning =

Dimensioning is the process of measuring either the area or the volume that an object occupies. It is the method of calculating capacity for the storage, handling, transporting and invoicing of goods. Vehicles and storage units have both volume and weight capacity limits and can easily become full in terms of volume before they reach their capacity in weight. By dimensioning for capacity needs, companies and warehouses can make optimal use of space in order to minimize costs in order to maximize profits.

== Background ==
In 1985, the Norwegian company Cargoscan, which officially became part of the Mettler Toledo group in 2000, began supplying dimensioners and data capture products to transport and logistics companies around the world. The aim was to provide the industry with a system for revenue recovery and protection. It seemed that if carriers were to take both weight and volume into consideration when invoicing, they could charge customers more fairly according to services provided and make better use of resources.

== In transport and logistics ==
Shipping costs have historically been calculated based on weight alone. By charging only by weight, lightweight, low-density packages become unprofitable for freight carriers due to the amount of space they take up in trucks, aircraft, and ships in proportion to their actual weight. By using dimensioning technology to calculate an item's dimensional weight, carriers are able to charge based on either volume or weight, depending on which is greater.

In the warehousing industry, dimensioning is used to provide an overview of the volume items in stock which can reduce the costs of materials, return handling, shipping and manpower. It can also be used to determine capacity limits for storage to determine if additional storage requirements are needed at some point.

The main reasons that companies choose to invest in automated dimensioning systems include reduced operational costs, revenue recovery, increased throughput, reduced returns and quality control.

Dimensioning systems are used not only by the biggest companies in the industry such as DHL Express, United Parcel Service, FedEx and TNT but also by postal companies, shipping retailers, and small handling companies around the world
