= Dimensioners =

Dimensioners are weighing and volume measuring systems for measuring three-dimensional or cuboid-shaped objects such as packages, parcels, pallets, cartons and boxes. They are frequently used as part of a much larger logistical system in a distribution center, warehouse or trucking terminal facility. By knowing exactly how much space a parcel, object or pallet will occupy, warehouses and shipping companies are able optimize the space available to them.

== History ==
Dimensioners first appeared on the market in 1985 when a Norwegian company named Cargoscan saw a gap between carriers' income and their potential income and began producing dimensioning and data capture solutions for companies all over the world. Since then, automated dimensioning solutions produced by different manufacturers have come to market.

There are various technologies used in dimensioning devices varying from point distance sensors to 3D-cameras. Form factors vary from large overhead structures for large freight dimensioning to conveyor based system for package dimensioning, as well as mobile dimensioners in the form of mobile phones augmented with 3D cameras or Lidar sensors using computer vision applications to dimension packages and pallets.

== Types of Dimensioning Equipment ==
=== Large Freight Dimensioners ===
Also known as pallet dimensioners, these large devices obtain accurate measurements of palletized or crated freight and are primarily used by shippers and freight forwarders in pick/pack operations on the outbound shipping side, and by freight carriers in the receiving area at hubs and terminals. Large dimensioners can be paired with weighing scales, barcode scanners, and 2D cameras to capture the complete load characteristics of a shipment. These complete systems are known as Dimensioning/Weighing/Scanning systems (DWS), and will create a shipment record containing the dimensions and other freight properties captured.

=== Package Dimensioners ===
Used to measure individual boxes, cartons and packages of various shapes and sizes, package dimensioners, also known as parcel dimensioners, are often found in warehousing and distribution center facilities. They work in the same manner as larger systems and can be installed as stand-alone units or as part of larger, automated systems where conveyors and sorting systems distribute high volumes of objects to a variety of locations based on their weight and dimensions.

== Trade Certifications ==
Where dimensioners are used for billing or trade-related activity, as is the case in parcel and less-than-truckload (LTL) freight transportation operations, dimensioners must carry legal-for-trade certification in the country of operation.

Trade certifications by country:

National Conference on Weights and Measures (NTEP) – United States

Measurement Canada – Canada

International Organization of Legal Metrology (OIML)

Measuring Instruments Directive (MID) – European Union
