= Ratio Utility Billing System =

Type of rental fee

The Ratio Utility Billing System (RUBS) describes any method used to determine the amount of a fee which is labeled to represent a landlord's business expense (typically but not necessarily a utility expense) and is charged to a tenant by a landlord, but not based on actual consumption of the utility or expense-incurring resource by the tenant.

Typical landlord expenses in this system include but are not limited to water, sewer, electric utilities or internet service. There is no requirement that the total fee revenue be less than or equal to the landlord expense to which it is related and there is no set method to calculate the fee. However, state and local ordinances may impact the fee calculation. RUBS is not legal in all US states.

The fee may have various names, but is often referred to as a utility fee. It is an additional fee paid to the landlord on top of the stated rent in the lease. The IRS requires RUBS payments to be included in gross rent. Landlords often use a 3rd party collector for this fee.

The contract structure created by the Ratio Utility Billing System is a lump sum (rent) plus estimated expenses incurred by the tenant (RUBS fees), also known as a cost plus contract. Such a contract may contain a Guaranteed Maximum Price (GMP) but in RUBS, they typically do not.

RUBS has been criticized for being non-transparent and onerous to dispute.
