= OpenHAN =

Home powerline networking standards

The OpenHAN standards for home networks (sometimes called home grids) was promoted by groups such as openAMI (Advanced Metering Infrastructure) and UtilityAMI. Both efforts aim to standardize powerline networking interoperation from a utility point of view and ensure reliable communications co-extant with AC power outlets. Both utilities and vendors of home control have promoted such standards aggressively . The openHAN label usually denotes standards favored by the utilities, not other service providers. It should be distinguished from the openADR standards that were promoted to ensure open access to customer electricity use data by all service providers.

== Utility rationale ==
A major rationale for a single set of standards is for the utilities themselves to provide a unified home energy monitor that "provides prompt, convenient feedback on electrical or other energy use. Devices may also display cost of energy used, and estimates of greenhouse gas emissions. Various studies have shown a reduction in home energy use of 4-15% through use of home energy display. Electricity use may be measured with an inductive clamp placed around the electric main, via the electric meter (either through an optical port, or by sensing the meters actions), by communicating with a smart meter, or by direct connection to the electrical system." Such reductions are contingent on every smart appliance reporting to a single central monitor.

In the US, the National Broadband Plan emphasized (in its "goal 6") that consumers must be able to share usage data with literally any service provider, not just their electric distributor, who must then be able to provide simple instructions or direct remote control of the consumer's residential appliances and home grid.

Utilities accordingly have been motivated to remain ahead of the technology curve and aggressively roll out these capabilities internally. "With increasing investments in smart meters and the smart grid, these systems have the capability of integrating AMI/MDM data from multiple vendor sources. Progress reports can be provided online and by mail, and outbound messaging can be Web-based and/or SMS text-based for maximum reach. When integrated with the billing process for either print or online presentment, the utility can communicate to the customer valuable information to increase the understanding of energy use, its drivers, how to save, and comparisons to standards in their area."

=== Architecture ===
Perhaps reflecting utility influence, OpenHAN was one of the original NIST smart grid standards sanctioned for by the North American Electric Reliability Corporation (NERC). Unlike most other networking standards, it uses in-home wiring between AC-powered devices. It primarily relies on AC powerline networking as defined by IEEE 1901 and packet management under ITU G.hn. The closest DC equivalent is power over Ethernet (PoE). These are used for smart thermostats and other smart appliances, put power and data all on one wire, and similarly have about one gigabit capacity. Unlike PoE which requires cat5 or cat6 Ethernet wiring redundant with the AC wiring, OpenHAN makes use of all existing wire (AC outlets, cable coax and telephone cat3).

In the OpenHAN architecture, "The display portion is remote from the measurement, communicating with the sensor using a cable, power-line communications, or using radio. Online displays are also available which allow the user to display near real-time consumption on any device that can connect to the Internet. These displays can reduce household energy consumption by providing real-time feedback to homeowners so they can change their energy using behavior. A study using the PowerCost Monitor deployed in 500 Ontario homes by Hydro One showed an average 6.5% drop in total electricity use when compared with a similarly sized control group. Hydro One subsequently offered free power monitors to 30,000 customers based on the success of the pilot. Blue Line Innovations also indicates 100,000 units in the market today." Other customer relationship management tactics can be used to reinforce and encourage reduction of energy use, including using direct outbound messages.

According to the utilities involved, all smart appliances and smart meters (which also must meet openADR standards for energy demand management) must meet the OpenHAN standard. Its appliance interface connector is meant to ensure that all openHAN devices can communicate with each other. The energy services interface defines how energy use is managed. Implementing companies include Synapse, the Zigbee and HomePlug consortia, Trilliant, United Illuminating, Ingersoll-Rand and others closely affiliated with the utilities and seeking to sell them more equipment.

== History ==
A task force of the Open Smart Grid Users Group published a systems requirement specification in 2008, which was revised in August 2010.

== See also ==
- Open metering system
- Smart meter
