= Unit load =

Standard size for storage and handling

Reach truck handling stretch wrapped unit load

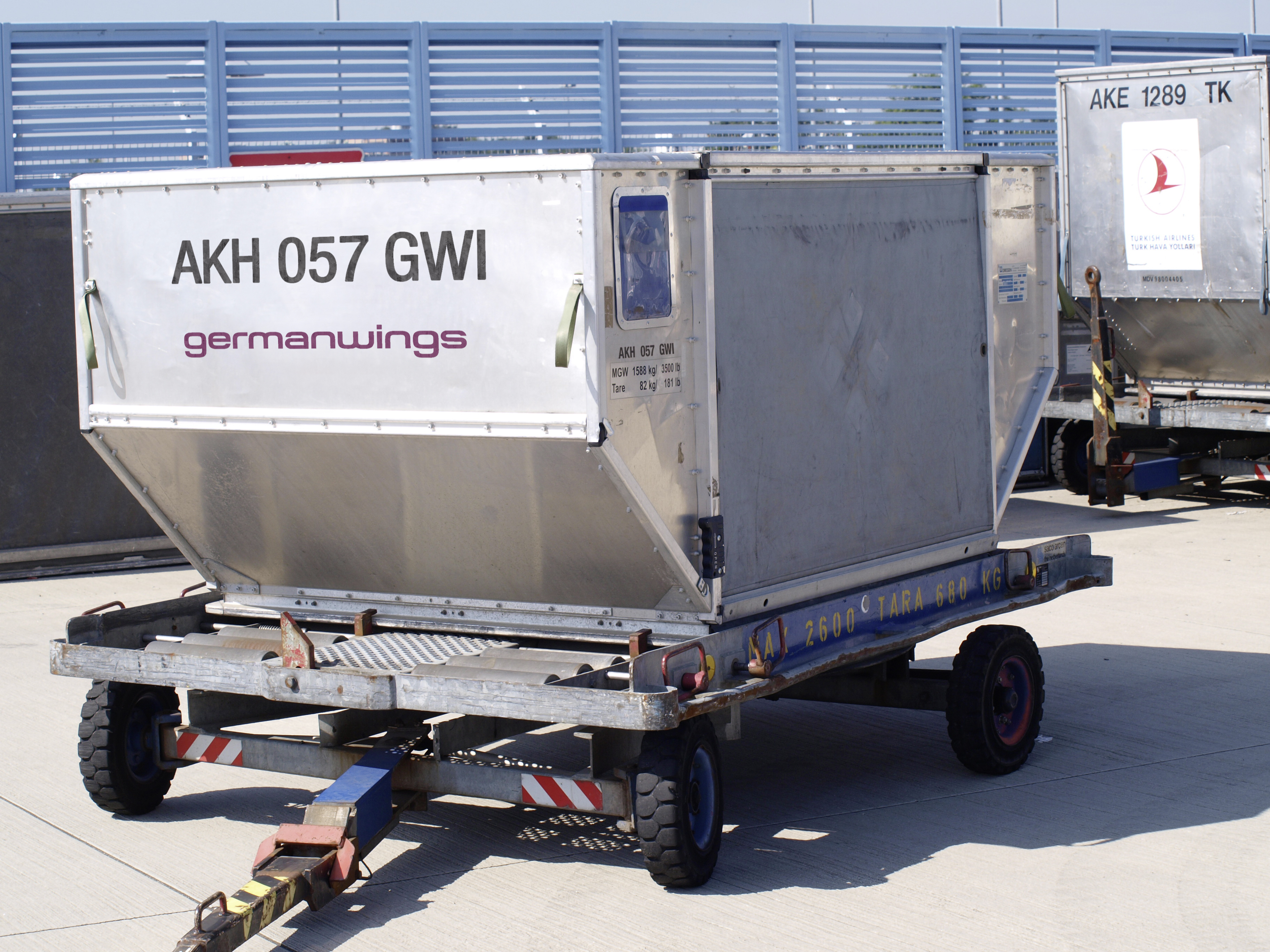
Air cargo container of the AKH type on a trailer

The term unit load refers to the size of an assemblage into which a number of individual items are combined for ease of storage and handling, for example a pallet load represents a unit load which can be moved easily with a pallet jack or forklift truck, or a container load represents a unit for shipping purposes. A unit load can be packed tightly into a warehouse rack, intermodal container, truck or boxcars, yet can be easily broken apart at a distribution point, usually a distribution center, wholesaler, or retail store for sale to consumers or for use.

== Function ==
Most consumer and industrial products move through the supply chain in unitized or unit load form for at least part of their distribution cycle. Unit loads make handling, storage, and distribution more efficient. They help reduce handling costs and damage by reducing individual handling.

A typical unit load might consist of corrugated fiberboard boxes stacked on a pallet or slip sheet and stabilized with stretch wrap, pressure-sensitive tape, strapping or shrink wrap. About 2 billion unit loads are in daily use in the United States.

== Unit load design ==
There are three kinds of unit load design: component-based, systems-based, and standards-compliant. These have different applications.

=== Component-based design ===
Component-based design is the outmoded ad hoc method of unit load design. Components are sometimes over-specified to get assured performance, or tested to get inexpensive economic performance.

Unit load storage and distribution systems consist of several interacting parts:

- Packaging and labeling (with product)
- Pallet
- Handling/storage equipment
- The distribution environment (shock, vibration, humidity, temperature, etc.)

Considerable knowledge exists regarding the design of each of these components: their interactions have more recently been studied. When packaging, pallet, and handling systems are designed separately at different locations by different teams, the result might be inefficient unit load systems.

The consequences of independent component-based design in the supply chain can include:

- Unsafe workplaces
- Product damage
- High packaging costs
- Reduced handling efficiency
- Wasted natural resources
- Reduction of environmental quality

=== Systems-based design ===
Systems-based design is a proven process of unit load component cost optimization based on an understanding of how the pallet, packaging and material handling equipment interact during product distribution and storage to design the unit load component parts.

A systems-based approach to unit load design uses software tools and lab testing to create a package that uses just the right amount of material to protect the product, make for safe handling and transportation and minimize the use of non-recyclable materials.

Companies must now consider sustainability when determining how their packaging products will be reused or recycled at the end of their journey. By combining sustainability with unit load science, they not only create the optimal unit load, but also reduce the amount of packaging material used to transport that load, maximizing the materials that can be recycled and minimizing what goes into a landfill.

Unit loads move via an unpredictable combination of many types of vehicles and storage areas, and the exact set is difficult to predict. Therefore, unit loads must be designed to travel by any such vehicles, and be stored in a wide variety of places. There are many similarities in the requirements for long-term storage and long-distance transportation of unit loads.

Factors considered in unit load systems-based design include:

- Distribution vibration and resonance
- Load bridging and deformation
- Unit load deflections
- Interfacial friction and load stability
- Compression stress and product protection
- Vertical and horizontal stabilization

Often a few inexpensive additions to the packaging can stabilize or stiffen a critical part and give good unit-load performance at a low cost.

=== Standards-compliant design ===
Standards permit a unit load to be designed and tested to meet a written specification or test method. A unit load can be verified to comply with a standard and validated to determine that the unit load is indeed effective.

Standards provide institutional memory of the many conditions in real logistic trains, and collect the best practices for design and testing unit loads. Standards also describe load requirements, so that logistic providers can plan to meet them.

- Material-based standards describe proven designs for particular circumstances. These are often used to describe unit load components such as pallets, strapping, seals, caps, retaining rings and battens.
- Performance testing standards describe needs and allow flexibility in the choice of materials. These are applied to particular unit load designs.

ASTM D4169 has standard test protocols for unit loads. These vary based on the value of the load, the expected hazards, and the distribution environment. This is a performance-based standard.

Another standard for unit loads is MIL-STD-1660, a standard for ammunition unit loads. DOD unit loads generally use 40 in × 48 in (1,016 mm × 1,219 mm) pallets, which unfortunately do not pack efficiently into ISO containers. They weigh less than 4,000 lb (1,814 kg) to limit the stresses on handling equipment. They are weatherproof, and stack 16 ft (4.877 m) high. They often use steel pallets, steel straps with notched seals, outdoor plywood, and plastic film. MIL-STD-1660 mandates that loads must never be less than the width of a pallet, while permitting some overhang. The markings are LOGMARS bar codes and standard inventory numbers. The standard describes major parts of the logistic path, including storage, ship, air, truck, forklift and sling (i.e. ship-to-ship and parachute). There are auxiliary standards for ship-to-ship transfers, and amphibious transfers. There are tests for stacking, transport, sling, forklift and pallet jack, impact, drop tests, tip, water-retention (i.e. weather), and safe disassembly.

MIL-STD-1660 at first looks like overdesign to commercial unit-load designers. However, similar marking standards, safety, stability, volumetric efficiency, weight limits and impact resistance are routinely needed in commercial logistics. Sling handling is routine for small ports and noncontainer transports. Weatherproofness could be optional. It is sometimes valuable, and the baggies are cheap. High, standardized stacking could be optional as well. It is expensive, but sometimes valuable for rackless and military customers.

== See also ==
- 463L master pallet, a wood and aluminium air cargo pallet primarily used by the United States Air Force
- Concrete masonry unit
- Crane (machine)
- IPPC, guidelines that affect the treatment of pallets used for international shipments
- Palletized load system
- ULD, lightweight aluminium and plastic pallet or container for aircraft
- Less than truckload shipping
- Dimensional weight for Cube Factor
