= Heat cost allocator =

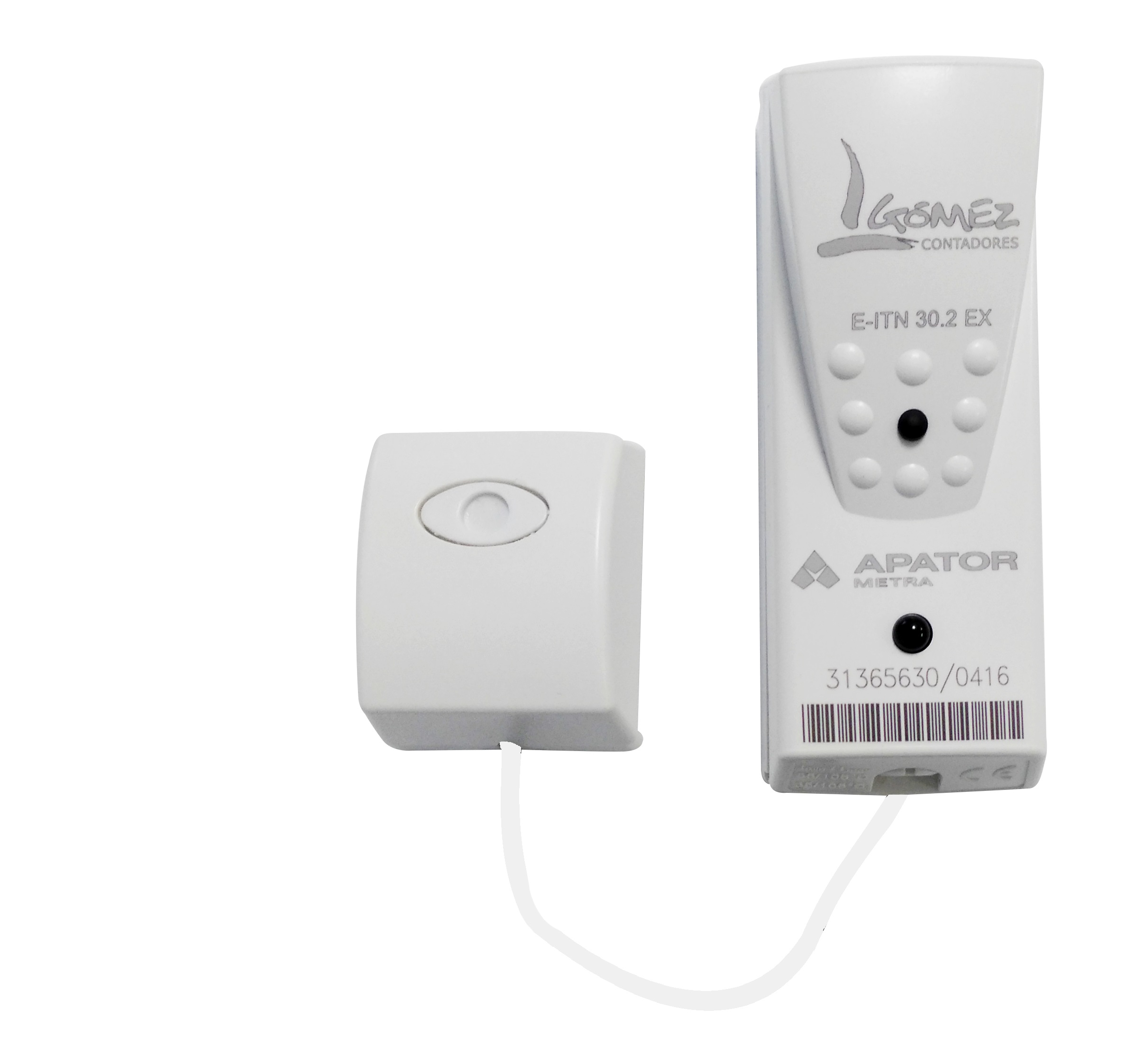
Electronic heat cost allocator with probe

Heat cost allocators are devices attached to individual radiators in buildings that measure the total heat output of the individual radiator. Heat cost allocators can be either electronic, where one or two electronic thermosensors and a microcontroller are used to calculate the heat consumption of radiator by the temperature difference between the radiator and the air in room, or evaporative, where a special, calibrated liquid in a capillary tube records the total heat absorbed from the air (for which an average allowance is made) in addition to that output by the radiator. Tubes filled with methyl benzoate according to DIN EN 835 can be used by checking the color change.

Heat cost allocators are typically installed in homes that share a central heat generation source, such as in multi-family buildings or in district heating systems. This supports utility submetering: billing residents based on energy used, which encourages residents to conserve energy. Heat cost allocators are an alternative to heat meters, which are more direct and accurate in how they measure heat, but are not always technically feasible or cost-effective.

== Working principle ==
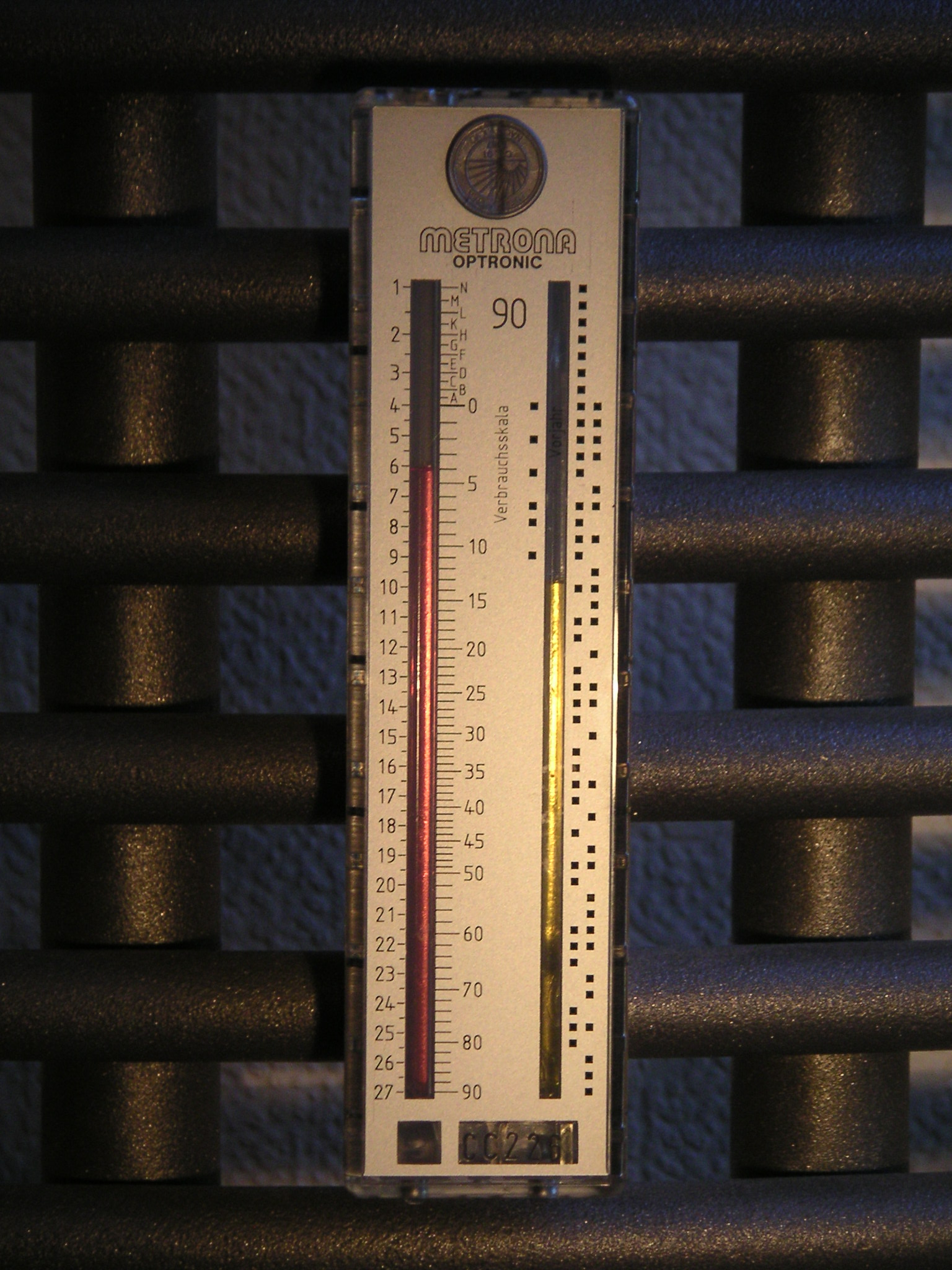
Capillary evaporative heat cost allocator

As a radiator heats a room, the surface of the radiator heats up. The temperature of the surface (or the temperature difference to room temperature for electronic two-sensor devices) is integrated over the heating period (one year according to the heating costs ordinance) and thus forms the measured value.

Since the amount of heat emitted also depends on the size and type of radiator and the heat transfer between the radiator and the heat cost allocator, the measured value of each radiator is multiplied by an individual factor. This can be done in the heating bill. One then speaks of a unit scale, because every heat cost allocator is equipped with the same scale. If, on the other hand, the heat cost allocators on different radiators are equipped with different scales, called product scales, no conversion takes place because the factor has already been taken into account by the choice of scale. With electronic heat cost allocators, the scaling is achieved through programming. The evaluation factor is determined when the heat cost allocator is installed. For this purpose, the manufacturer, and type of the radiator – as far as possible – are determined and measurements are taken. This leads to the radiator performance as the first part of the evaluation factor. The factor is then corrected by the Kc value, which describes the heat transfer between the heating medium, ultimately the radiator, and the heat cost allocator. The radiator evaluation requires the knowledge of precise data about the heat cost allocator used and the radiator, which are obtained in extensive series of measurements and tests.

== Standards ==
EU Energy Efficiency Directive 2012 directs member states to require heat meters where feasible, and allows heat cost allocators as an alternative. The directive specifies that heat cost allocators installed after 25 October 2020 must be remotely readable, and devices already installed must be retrofitted or replaced by 1 January 2027. Several European countries already required heat cost allocation before the directive was established.

European technical standards:

- DIN EN 834: Heat cost allocators for the determination of the consumption of room heating radiators - Appliances with electrical energy supply
- DIN EN 835: Heat cost allocators for the determination of the consumption of room heating radiators - Appliances without electrical energy supply based on the evaporation principle
