= Plug valve =

Subclass of stopcocks

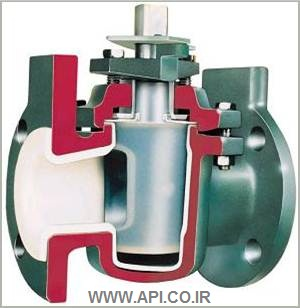
Super duplex plug valve.

Plug valves are valves with cylindrical or conically tapered "plugs" which can be rotated inside the valve body to control flow through the valve. The plugs in plug valves have one or more hollow passageways going sideways through the plug, so that fluid can flow through the plug when the valve is open. Plug valves are simple and often economical.

When the plug is conically tapered, the stem/handle is typically attached to the larger diameter end of the plug. Plug valves usually do not have bonnets but often have the end of the plug with the handle exposed or mostly exposed to the outside. In such cases, there is usually not much of a stem. The stem and handle often come in one piece, often a simple, approximately L-shaped handle attached to the end of the plug. The other end of the plug is often exposed to the outside of the valve too, but with a mechanism that retains the plug in the body.

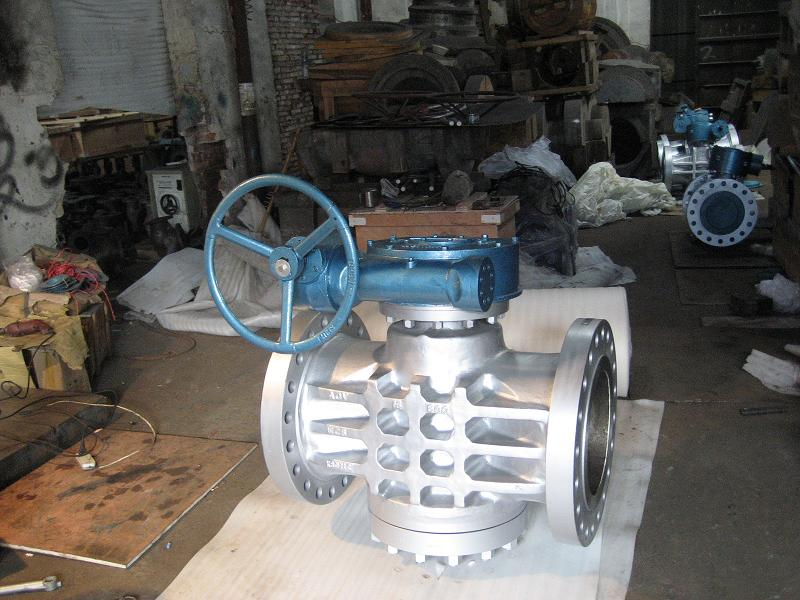
Handwheel operated plug valve.

The simplest and most common general type of plug valve is a 2-port valve with two positions: open to allow flow, and shut (closed) to stop flow. Ports are openings in the valve body through which fluid can enter or leave. The plug in this kind of valve has one passageway going through it. The ports are typically at opposite ends of the body; therefore, the plug is rotated a fourth of a full turn to change from open to shut positions. This makes this kind of plug valve a quarter-turn valve. There is often a mechanism limiting motion of the handle to a quarter turn, but not in glass stopcocks.

Slightly conically tapered metal (often brass) plug valves are often used as simple shut-off valves in household natural gas lines.

It is also possible for a plug valve to have more than two ports. In a 3-way plug valve, flow from one port could be directed to either the second or third port. A 3-way plug valve could also be designed to shift flow between ports 1 and 2, 2 and 3, or 1 and 3, and possibly even connect all three ports together. The flow-directing possibilities in multi-port plug valves are similar to the possibilities in corresponding multi-port ball valves or corresponding multi-port valves with a rotor. An additional possibility in plug valves is to have one port on one side of the plug valve and two ports on the other side, with two diagonal and parallel fluid pathways inside the plug. In this case, the plug can be rotated 180° to connect the port on the one side to either of the two ports on the other side.

Stopcocks used in laboratory glassware are typically forms of conically tapered plug valves. When fused with the glassware, the valve bodies are made of glass. Otherwise, they can be made of an inert plastic such as Teflon. The plugs can be made of a similar plastic or glass. When the plug is made of glass, the handle and plug are fused together in one piece out of glass. When glass is used for both the stopcock body and the plug, the contacting surfaces between them are special ground glass surfaces (see Laboratory glassware) often with stopcock grease in between. Special glass stopcocks are made for vacuum applications, such as in use with vacuum manifolds. Stopcock grease is always used in high vacuum applications to make the stopcock air-tight. Also if the plug valve is "locked" from being in the open or closed position for an extended amount of time lubricant can be added through the greaser with the valve in service.

== See also ==
- Ball valve
- Butterfly valve
- Check valve
- Control valve
- Diaphragm valve
- Flow limiter
- Four-way valve
- Gate valve
- Globe valve
- Mass flow controller
- Needle valve
- Plastic pressure pipe systems
