= Needle valve =

Type of valve with a small port

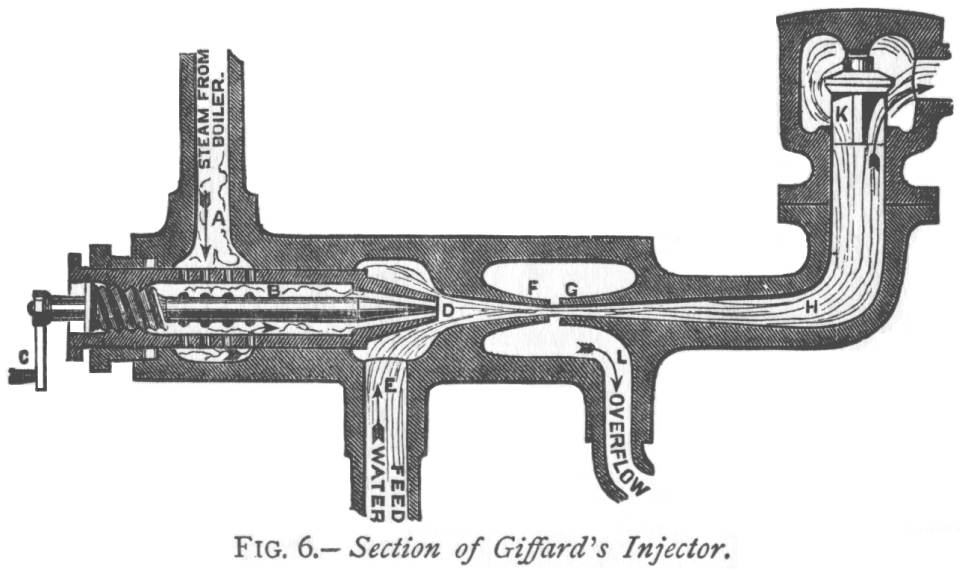
Giffard steam water injector (B-needle valve).

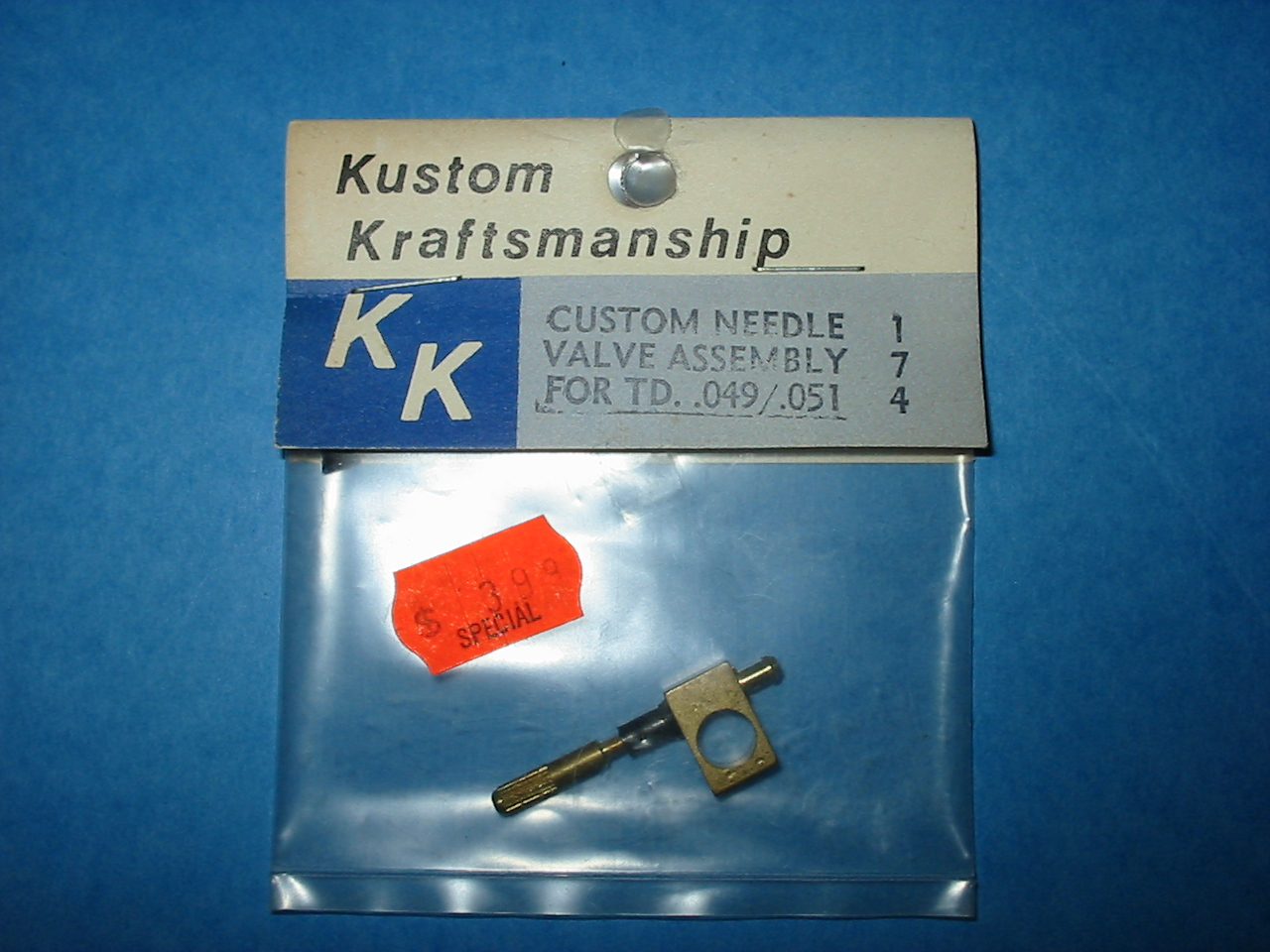
A needle valve.

A needle valve is a type of valve with a small port and a threaded, needle-shaped plunger. It allows precise regulation of flow, although it is generally only capable of relatively low flow rates.

== Construction and operation ==
An instrument needle valve uses a tapered pin to gradually open a space for fine control of flow. The flow can be controlled and regulated with the use of a spindle. A needle valve has a relatively small orifice with a long, tapered seat, and a needle-shaped plunger on the end of a screw, which exactly fits the seat.

As the screw is turned and the plunger retracted, flow between the seat and the plunger is possible; however, until the plunger is completely retracted, the fluid flow is significantly impeded. Since it takes many turns of the fine-threaded screw to retract the plunger, precise regulation of the flow rate is easily possible.

The virtue of the needle valve is from the vernier effect of the ratio between the needle's length and its diameter, or the difference in diameter between needle and seat. A long travel axially (the control input) makes for a very small and precise change radially (affecting the resultant flow).

Needle valves may also be used in vacuum systems, when a precise control of gas flow is required, at low pressure, such as when filling gas-filled vacuum tubes, gas lasers and similar devices.

== Uses ==
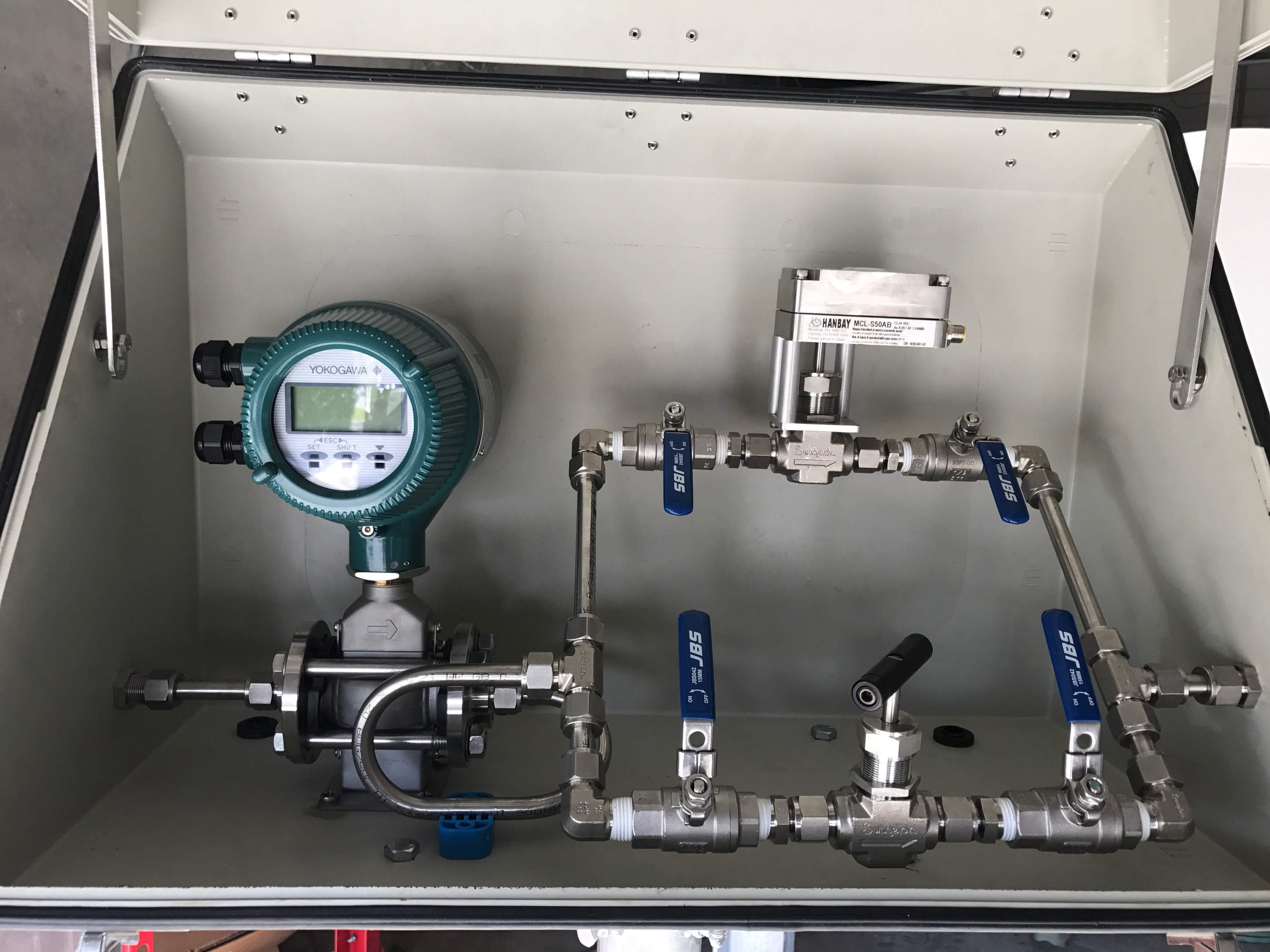
Electrically automated needle valve fluid on a fluid processing system.

Needle valves are usually used in flow-metering applications, especially when a constant, calibrated, low flow rate must be maintained for some time, such as the idle fuel flow in a carburettor.

Note that the float valve of a carburettor (controlling the fuel level within the carburettor) is not a needle valve, although it is commonly described as one. It uses a bluntly conical needle, but it seats against a square-edged seat rather than a matching cone. The intention here is to obtain a well-defined seat between two narrow mating surfaces, giving firm shutoff of the flow from only a light float pressure.

Needle valves are also commonly used to provide shut off for the pressure gauge or on applicators to shut off the supply of NH3 to the knives in anhydrous ammonia (NH3) applications.

Since flow rates are low and many turns of the valve stem are required to completely open or close, needle valves are not used for simple shutoff applications.

Since the orifice is small and the force advantage of the fine-threaded stem is high, needle valves are usually easy to shut off completely, with merely "finger-tight" pressure. The spindle and/or seat of a needle valve, especially one made from brass, are easily damaged by excessive turning force when shutting off the flow.

Small, simple needle valves are often used as bleed valves in water-heating applications.

Unlike a ball valve or valves with a rising stem, it is not easy to tell from examining the handle position whether the valve is open or closed.

== See also ==
- Ball valve
- Butterfly valve
- Control valve
- Diaphragm valve
- Flow limiter
- Gate valve
- Globe valve
- Mass flow controller
- Plastic pressure pipe systems
- Plug valve
