= Petcock =

Type of shutoff valve

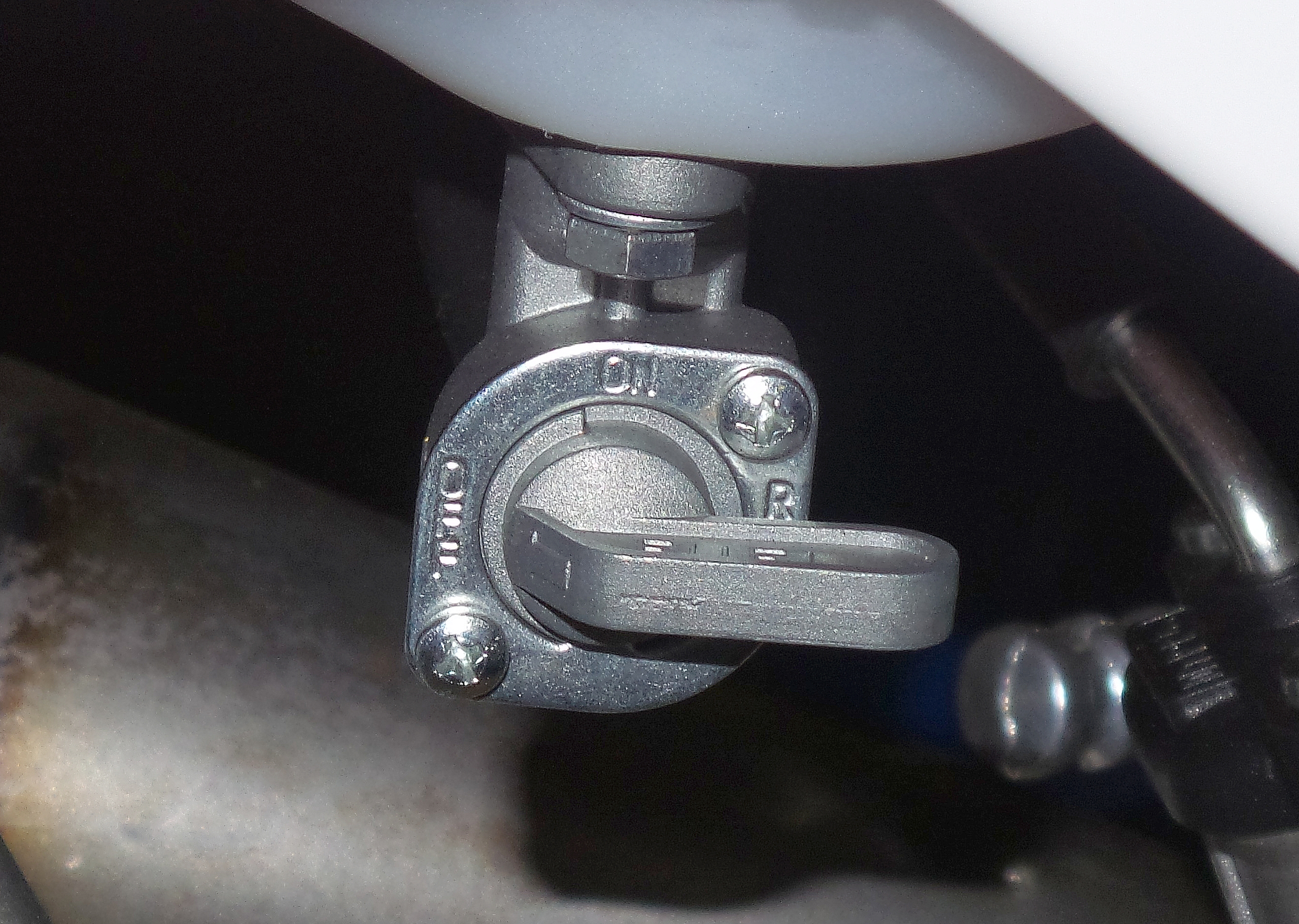
Close-up of a motorcycle petcock. It is in the "off" position.

A petcock is a small shut-off valve used to control the flow of liquid or gas. Historically, petcocks were threaded valves controlled by a butterfly handle; modern petcocks are typically ball valves.

Compared to the progressive control of a gate valve, a ball valve style petcock's is coarse, confining their use principally to on-off applications.

== Use ==
=== Motorcycle ===
Fuel petcock on a 1978 Yamaha XS400.

Most older motorcycles have a three-position fuel petcock valve (known as a "petrol tap" in the UK) mounted on or nearby the fuel tank to control the supply of gasoline: on, off, and reserve.

The reserve position accesses the bottom portion of the fuel tank. Many older motorcycles lacked a fuel gauge, making reliance on a fuel reserve a relatively common experience. Most now have an automatic, vacuum operated petcock (that may include a prime position which bypasses vacuum operation and allows fuel to flow to the carburetor without the engine turning over).

=== Automobile ===
The most common application of a petcock in an automobile is as a drain valve for a radiator.

Historically, petcocks were used on gravity-feed fuel systems found on automobiles. With universal adoption of fuel pumps they have all but disappeared in that application.

Some historic examples of gravity feed systems include the Porsche 356 and early Volkswagens, which have a petcock with off, on, and reserve positions, much like a motorcycle petcock.

Petcocks may be used in vehicle heating and cooling systems, such as limousines and tractor trailers.

=== Heavy equipment ===
Many John Deere and other tractors and stationary power units produced from the late 1920s to the early 1940s had compression relief petcocks on the engine block, one per cylinder. These were opened during starting to de-pressurize the cylinders when spinning the flywheel by hand. Once the engine started they were closed and the engine would begin running smoothly.

Petcocks are used to periodically drain water from diesel fuel water separators on some trucks.

=== Marine engine ===
The large MAN six-cylinder diesel engines used on German U-boats had petcocks that enabled the engineers to verify combustion in each cylinder. Opening one with the engine running would result in a long blue-white flame if the cylinder was firing correctly. The procedure is described in the novel Das Boot and shown in the film version.
