= Hydrogen valve =

Valve designed for hydrogen service

A hydrogen valve is a special type of valve that is used for hydrogen at very low temperatures or high pressures in hydrogen storage or for example hydrogen vehicles.

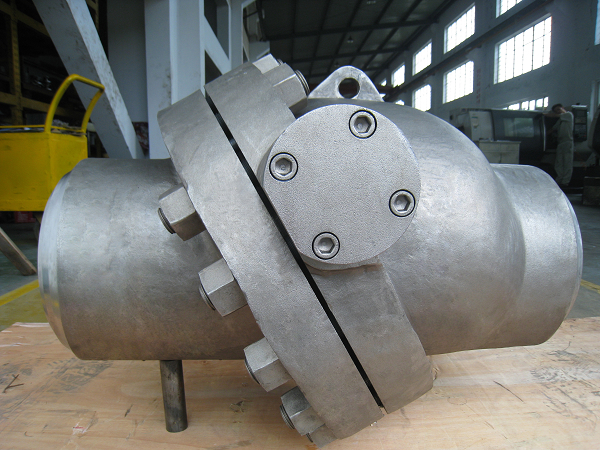
Inconel tilting disc check valve for hydrogen service.

== Types ==
High pressure ball valves up to 6000 psig (413 bar) at 250 degrees F (121 degrees C) and flow coefficients from 4.0 to 13.8.

== Material ==
Valves used in industrial hydrogen and oxygen applications, such as petrochemical processes, are often made of inconel.

== See also ==
- Diaphragm valve
- Gate valve
- Hydrogen tank
