= Dredge valve =

Valve for controlling dredging slurries

The dredge valve is a component of a Cutter Suction Dredge or a Trailing Suction Hopper Dredger that is used control the flow of water and sand in the suction and discharge pipes of one of these types of dredgers.

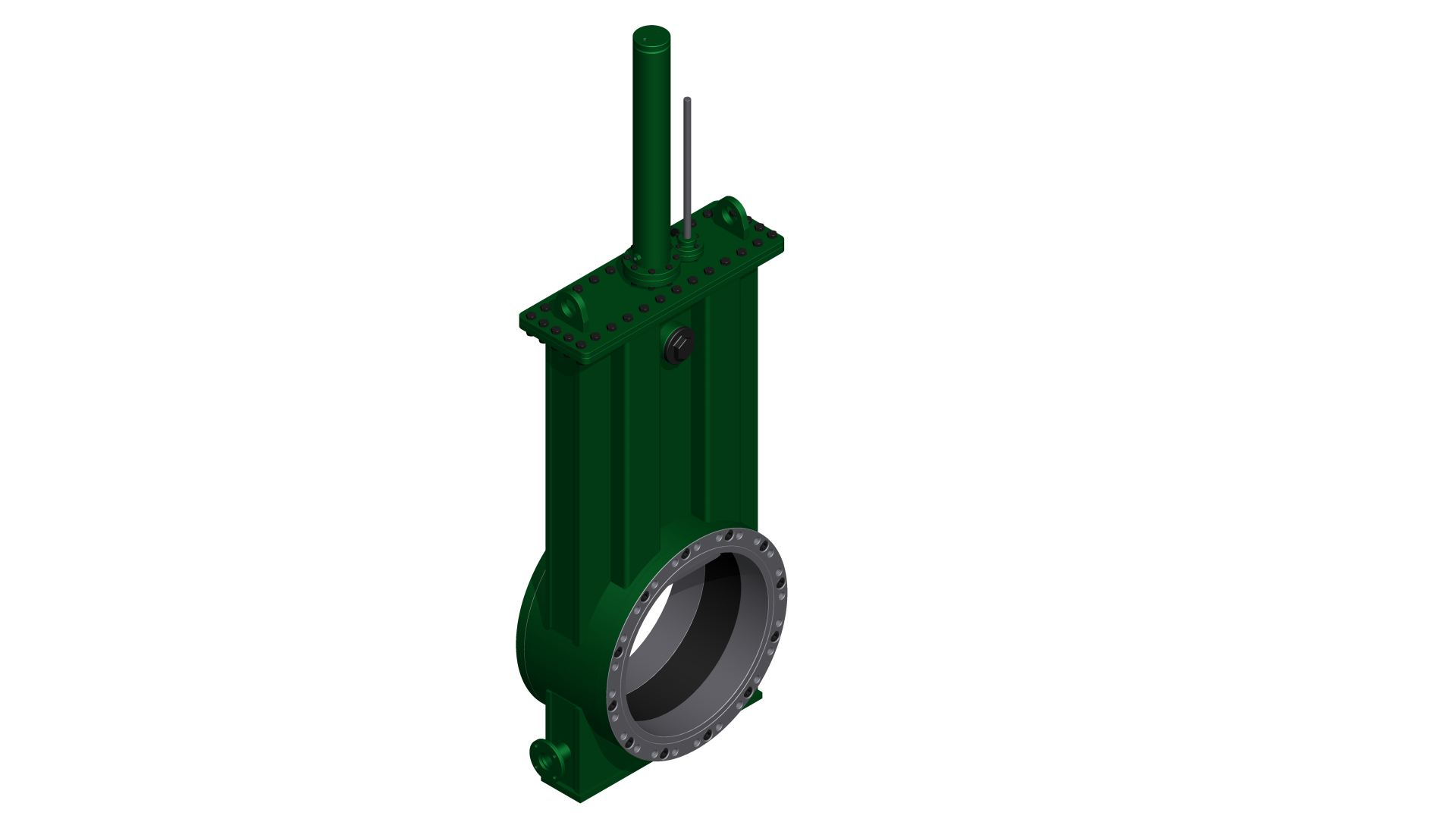
Dredge Valve CAD Design

There are 3 cases when this vertical valve can block or reduce the mixture flow of water and sand by lowering its gate:

- 1.from the hopper of the TSHD to the discharge pipe.
- 2.from the dredge cutter head of the CSD to the ship
- 3.from the dredge drag head of the TSHD to the ship

The dredge valve’s gate is hydraulically controlled, which poses maintenance challenges. The gate can be blocked and damaged by sand that enters through the dredge valve. In order to mitigate this and remain unobstructed, the dredge valve uses water flushing canals.

== See also ==
- Gate valve
