= Sleeve valve (water) =

A sleeve valve is a device typically used in a water supply or distribution system when there is a need to reduce high pressure or throttle flow. The sleeve valve consists of a cylindrical gate (tube) which slides over an inner sleeve. The inner sleeve consists of a series of nozzles specifically sized and arranged to provide a solution to cavitation issues frequently encountered in throttling applications with other valve types. Because of its design, it minimizes cavitation. Cavitation that does occur in severe throttling conditions is directed from the valve down to the center of the valve or pipe so that no erosion damage to the piping can take place.

== Types ==
There are three main types of sleeve valves: inline, angle pattern and downflow pattern. Inline sleeve valve can be installed in the pipeline or at the end of the pipeline for free discharge. Inline sleeve valve have an inlet section which allows upstream media to flow into an outer annular area. The flow then takes a 90° turn through the sleeve and collides with flow from the opposite side dissipating the energy. The flow then travels downstream through an exit spool on the downstream end. The angle pattern sleeve valve is installed at a 90° bend in place of an elbow. Angle pattern sleeve valves employ a similar design as the inline sleeve valve by creating an outer annular area to contain the media and a sleeve with tapered nozzles to pass the flow. The difference is that the flow direction after passing through the sleeve changes by 90°. Downflow pattern sleeve valves are installed at the end of a pipeline and discharge into sumps, reservoirs, stilling wells or tanks. Unlike inline and angle pattern the discharge of a downflow pattern is outward and is not contained by the valve itself.

== Advantages ==
Sleeve valves can operate for long periods of time over a high differential pressure across the valve. When a cavitation condition does exist the cavitation takes place surrounded by water. Unlike other valves, air is not necessary to control or suppress the cavitation. Because of this a single sleeve valve can replace several standard valves used in series. Sleeve valves can control flow and/or pressure over the entire stroke of the valve. Conventional control valves can typically control flow or pressure in the 20% to 80% range. Additionally, unlike conventional control valves the sleeve valve increases flow incrementally, i.e. 10% increase in stroke leads to a 10% increase in flow. Sleeve valves are adaptive to system or consumer requirements. The sleeve valve is designed to meet the requirements and allow for a wide range of variability of function. Most conventional control valves are designed to a specific set of conditions.

== Disadvantages ==
Sleeve valve are generally more expensive than other types of control valves. Typically, sleeve valves are employed in situations where they would replace multiple valves in series or where frequent maintenance may be required, Sleeve valves need to be used where large debris is not expected in the system. As the orifice holes are relatively small, it is possible and likely that any trash in system will collect in front of sleeve or even in the nozzles themselves. Access ports are generally provided to access the valve interior for debris removal.

== Installations ==
Typical installations for sleeve valves include the following: reservoir discharge, pump control, pressure regulation, turbine bypass, and tank level control.

- Reservoir discharge – sleeve valves are used to control flow and dissipate excess energy from a reservoir outlet. Commonly used in areas with a high pressure drop, the sleeve valve can discharge to the atmosphere, or to a submerged outlet in a downstream creek.
- Pressure regulation – a sleeve valve can be used to reduce pressure from a high pressure supply to a lower pressure distribution zone, or to discharge into a tank or reservoir as greatly reduced pressure to minimize damage to the tank. Typically a SCADA system controls the valve position.
- Turbine bypass – when a valve is needed to bypass an energy recovery turbine, a sleeve valve can minimize upstream and downstream pressure surges by slowly opening and closing in proportion with the turbine. The sleeve valve will dissipate the energy normally consumed by the turbine, thus allowing maintenance to be performed on the turbine, and also maintain downstream flow requirements.
- Level control – sleeve valves are ideal to control the water level in a distribution system storage tank in potable water applications.
