= Plastic pipework =

Tubular section or hollow cylinder made of plastic

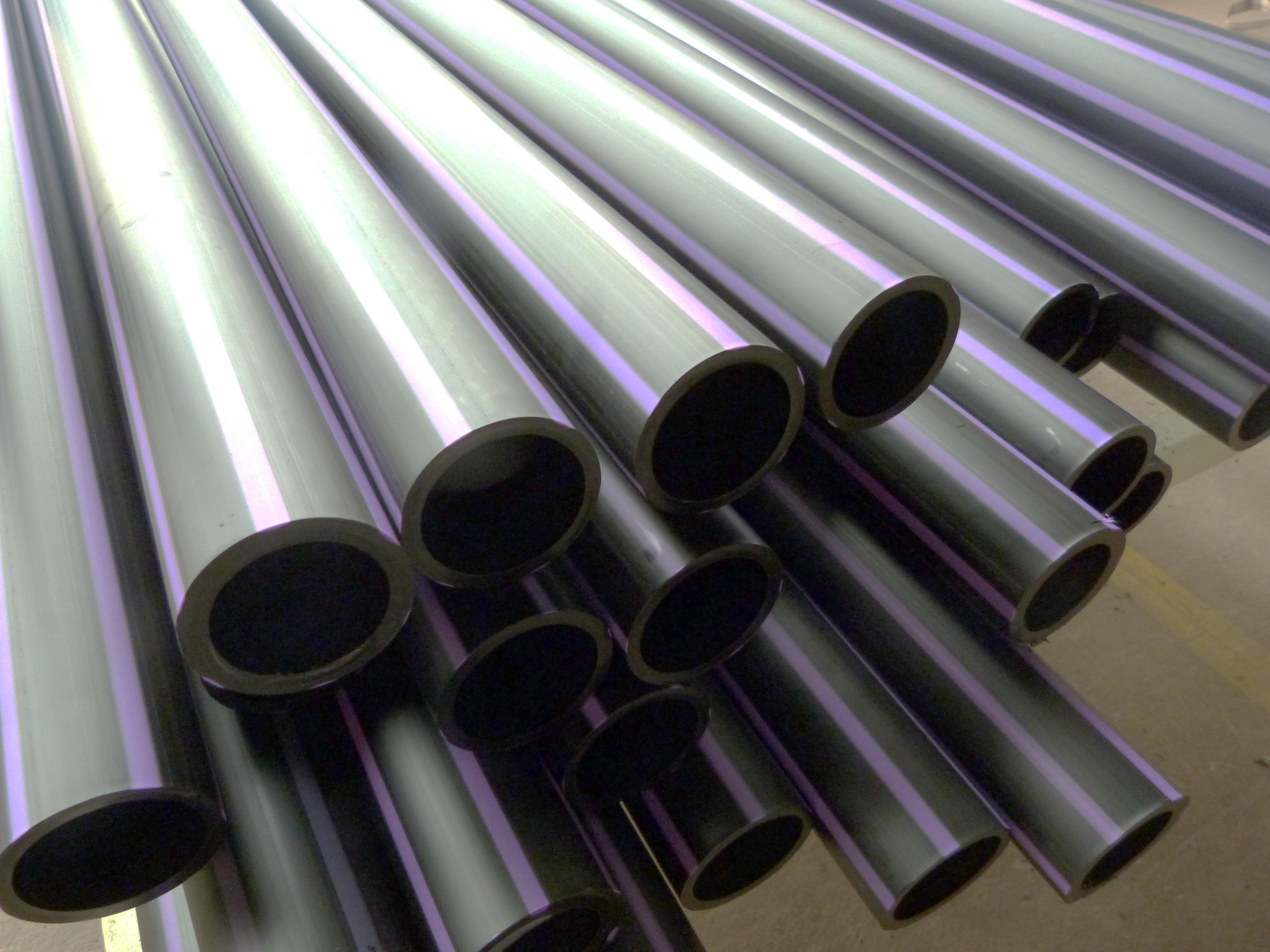
Plastic pipe lengths manufactured in Australia by extruding HDPE material

Plastic pipe is a tubular section, or hollow cylinder, made of plastic. It is usually, but not necessarily, of circular cross-section, used mainly to convey substances which can flow—liquids and gases (fluids), slurries, powders and masses of small solids. It can also be used for structural applications; hollow pipes are far stiffer per unit weight than solid members.

Plastic pipework is used for the conveyance of drinking water, waste water, chemicals, heating fluid and cooling fluids, foodstuffs, ultra-pure liquids, slurries, gases, compressed air, irrigation, plastic pressure pipe systems, and vacuum system applications.

== Types ==
There are three basic types of plastic pipe:

=== Solid wall pipe ===
Extruded pipes consisting of one layer of a homogeneous matrix of thermoplastic material which is ready for use in a pipeline.

=== Structured wall pipe ===
Structured-wall pipes and fittings are products which have an optimized design with regard to material usage to achieve the physical, mechanical and performance requirements. Structured Wall Pipes are tailor made solutions of piping systems, for a variety of applications and in most cases developed in cooperation with users.

=== Barrier pipe ===
Pipe incorporating a flexible metallic layer as the middle of three bonded layers. Barrier pipe is used, for example, to provide additional protection for the contents passing through the pipe (particularly drinking water) from aggressive chemicals or other pollution when laid in ground contaminated by previous use.

Most plastic pipe systems are made from thermoplastic materials. The production method involves melting the material, shaping, and then cooling. Pipes are normally produced by extrusion.

== Standards ==
Plastic pipe systems fulfil a variety of service requirements. Product standards for plastics pipe systems are prepared within the CEN/TC155 standards committee. These requirements are described in a set of European Product Standards for each application alongside their specific characteristics, for example:

- Conveyance of drinking water: Hygienic requirements
- Conveyance of gas: Highest Safety requirements
- Plastic pipes for radiant heating and floor heating: Temperature resistance over decades
- Sewer applications: High chemical resistance

Plastic pipes are capable of fulfilling the specific requirement for each application. They do so over a long lifetime and with reliability and safety. The key success factor is achieved by maintaining consistently high quality levels. For plastic pipe products, these levels are defined by the different standards. Two aspects are fundamentally important for the performance of plastic pipes: flexibility and long lifetime.

== Materials used ==
- ABS (acrylonitrile butadiene styrene)
- CPVC (chlorinated polyvinyl chloride)
- HDPE (high-density polyethylene)
- PB-1 (polybutylene)
- PE (polyethylene) of various densities, also abbreviated to LDPE, MDPE and HDPE (low, medium and high density polyethylene; the medium density version is at times referred to as "black alkathene" in the UK)
- PE-RT (polyethylene of raised temperature (RT))
- PEX (cross-linked polyethylene)
- PP (polypropylene)
- PVDF (polyvinylidene difluoride)
- UPVC (unplasticized polyvinyl chloride)

== Material characteristics ==
=== ABS (acrylonitrile butadiene styrene) ===
Acrylonitrile butadiene styrene (ABS) is used for the conveyance of potable water, slurries and chemicals. Most commonly used for DWV (drain-waste-vent) applications. It has a wide temperature range, from -40 °C to +60 °C.

ABS is a thermoplastic material and was originally developed in the early 1950s for use in oil fields and the chemical industry. The variability of the material and its relative cost effectiveness has made it a popular engineering plastic. It can be tailored to a range of applications by modifying the ratio of the individual chemical components.

They are used mainly in industrial applications where high impact strength and rigidity are essential.

This material is also used in non-pressure piping systems for soil and waste.

=== CPVC (chlorinated polyvinyl chloride) ===
Chlorinated polyvinyl chloride (CPVC) is resistant to many acids, bases, salts, paraffinic hydrocarbons, halogens and alcohols. It is not resistant to solvents, aromatics and some chlorinated hydrocarbons. It can carry higher temperature liquids than uPVC with a max operating temperature reaching 200 °F (93.3 °C). Due to its greater temperature threshold and chemical resistance, CPVC is one of the main recommended material choices in residential, commercial, and industrial water and liquid transport.

=== HDPE (high-density polyethylene) ===
High-density polyethylene (HDPE) - HDPE pipe is strong, flexible and light weight. It has a zero leak rate when fused together.

=== PB-1 (polybutylene) ===
PB-1 is used in pressure piping systems for hot and cold potable water, pre-insulated district heating networks, and surface heating and cooling systems. Key properties are weldability, temperature resistance, flexibility and high hydrostatic pressure resistance. One standard type, PB 125, has a minimum required strength (MRS) of 12.5 MPa. It also has low noise transmission, low linear thermal expansion, no corrosion and calcification.

PB-1 piping systems are no longer sold in North America. Market share in Europe and Asia is small but steadily growing. In some markets, e.g. Kuwait, UK, Korea and Spain, PB-1 has a strong position.

=== PE (polyethylene) ===
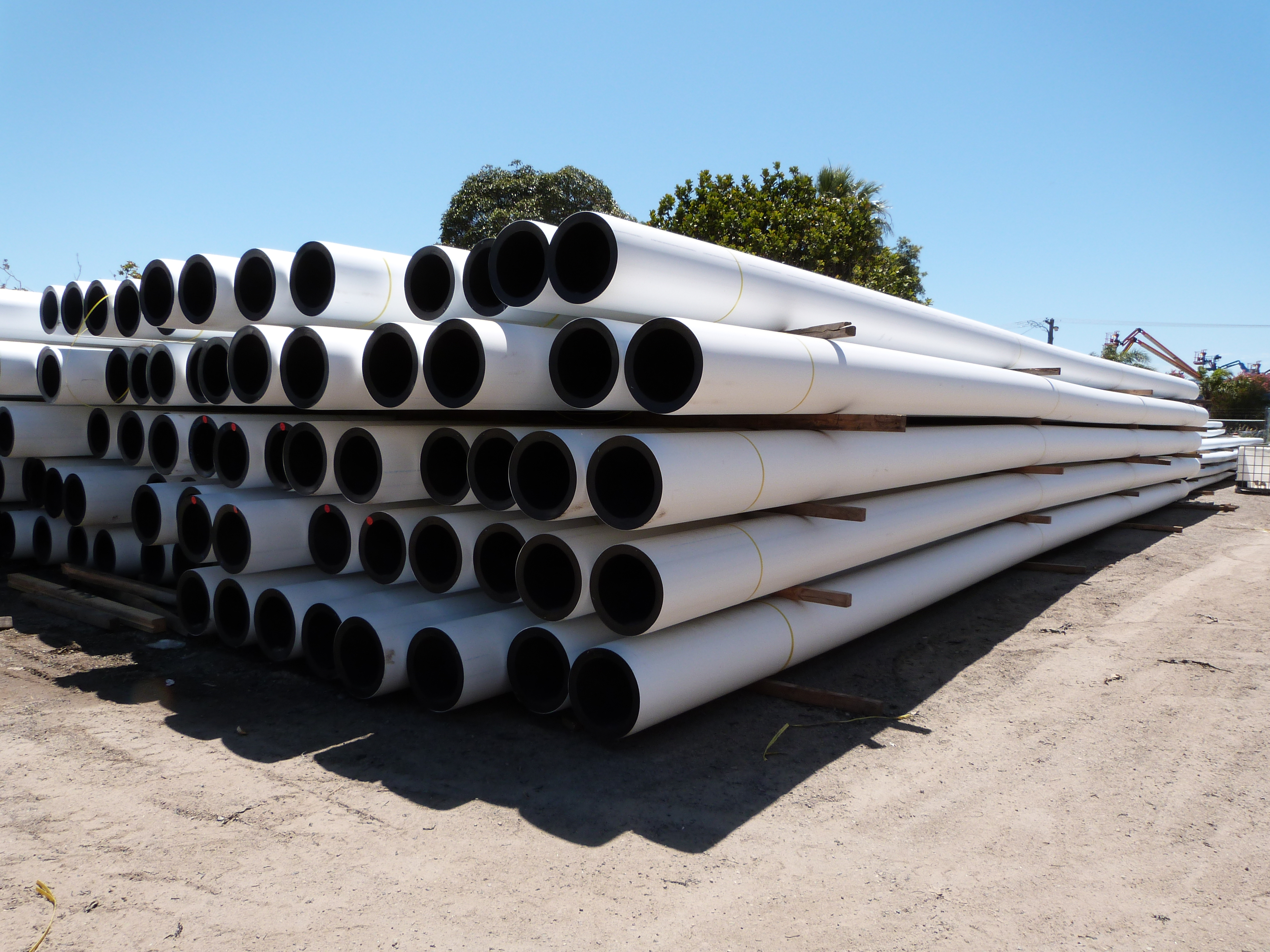
Polyethylene Piping in Australia, made from HDPE material.

Polyethylene has been successfully used for the safe conveyance of potable and waste water, hazardous waste, and compressed gases for many years. Two variants are HDPE pipe (high-density polyethylene) and the more heat resistant PEX (cross-linked polyethylene, also XLPE).

PE has been used for pipes since the early 1950s. PE pipes are made by extrusion in a variety of sizes dimensions. PE is lightweight, flexible and easy to weld. Its smooth interior finish ensures good flow characteristics. Continuous development of the material has enhanced its performance, leading to rapidly increasing usage by major water and gas utility companies throughout the world.

The pipes are also used in lining and trench-less technologies, the so-called no-dig applications where the pipes are installed without digging trenches without any disruption above ground. Here the pipes may be used to line old pipe systems to reduce leakage and improve water quality. These solutions are therefore helping engineers to rehabilitate antiquated pipe systems. Excavation is minimal and the process is carried out quickly below ground.

Also for PE pipe material, several studies demonstrated the long track record with expected lifetime of more than 50 years.

Cross-linked polyethylene is commonly referred to as XLPE or PEX. It is a thermoplastic material that can be made in three different ways depending how the cross-linking of the polymer chains is being made. PEX was developed in the 1950s. It has been used for pipes in Europe since the early 1970s and has been gaining rapid popularity over the last few decades. Often supplied in coils, it is flexible and can therefore be led around structures without fittings. Its strength at temperatures ranging from below freezing up to almost boiling makes it an ideal pipe material for hot and cold water installations, radiator and under floor heating, de-icing and ceiling cooling applications

=== PE-RT ===
Polyethylene of Raised Temperature (RT) or PE-RT expands the traditional properties of polyethylene. Enhanced strength at high temperatures are thus made possible through special molecular design and manufacturing process control.

Its resistance to low or high temperatures makes PE-RT ideal for a broad range of hot and cold water pipe applications.

=== PP (polypropylene) ===
Polypropylene is suitable for use with foodstuffs, potable and ultra pure waters, as well as within the pharmaceutical and chemical industries.

PP is a thermoplastic polymer made from polypropylene. It was first invented in the 1950s and has been used for pipes since the 1970s. Due to the high impact resistance combined with good stiffness and high chemical resistance makes this material suitable for sewer applications. A good performance at operating temperature range from up to 60 °C (140 °F) (continuous) makes this material suitable for in-house discharge systems for soil & waste. A special PP grade with high temperature behaviour up to 90 °C (194 °F) (short-term) makes that material a good choice for in-house warm water supply.

=== PVDF (polyvinylidene difluoride) ===
Polyvinylidene difluoride (PVDF) is a fairly non-reactive, thermoplastic fluoropolymer with excellent chemical and thermal resistance for plastic pipework uses. PVDF resin is produced through polymerization of the vinylidene fluoride monomer. The PVDF resin is then used to make PVDF pipe as well as many other products.

Industries and applications select PVDF pipe due to its inert, durable qualities. PVDF piping is used most in the chemical process industry due to its ability to plumb aggressive, corrosive solutions. PVDF pipe also sees common use in high purity applications, semi-conductor fabrication, electronics / electricity, pharmaceutical developments, and nuclear waste processing.

PVDF piping specifications and performance characteristics approve PVDF pipe up to 248 °F (120 °C) under pressurized system conditions. The pipe does not support fungus growth according to military test standard method 508, 81-0B. Dissimilar from other common thermoplastic pipes, (uPVC, CPVC, PE, PP), PVDF does not exhibit sensitivity to UV light or ozone oxidative damage, approving it for long term outdoor uses.

=== uPVC (unplasticized polyvinyl chloride) ===
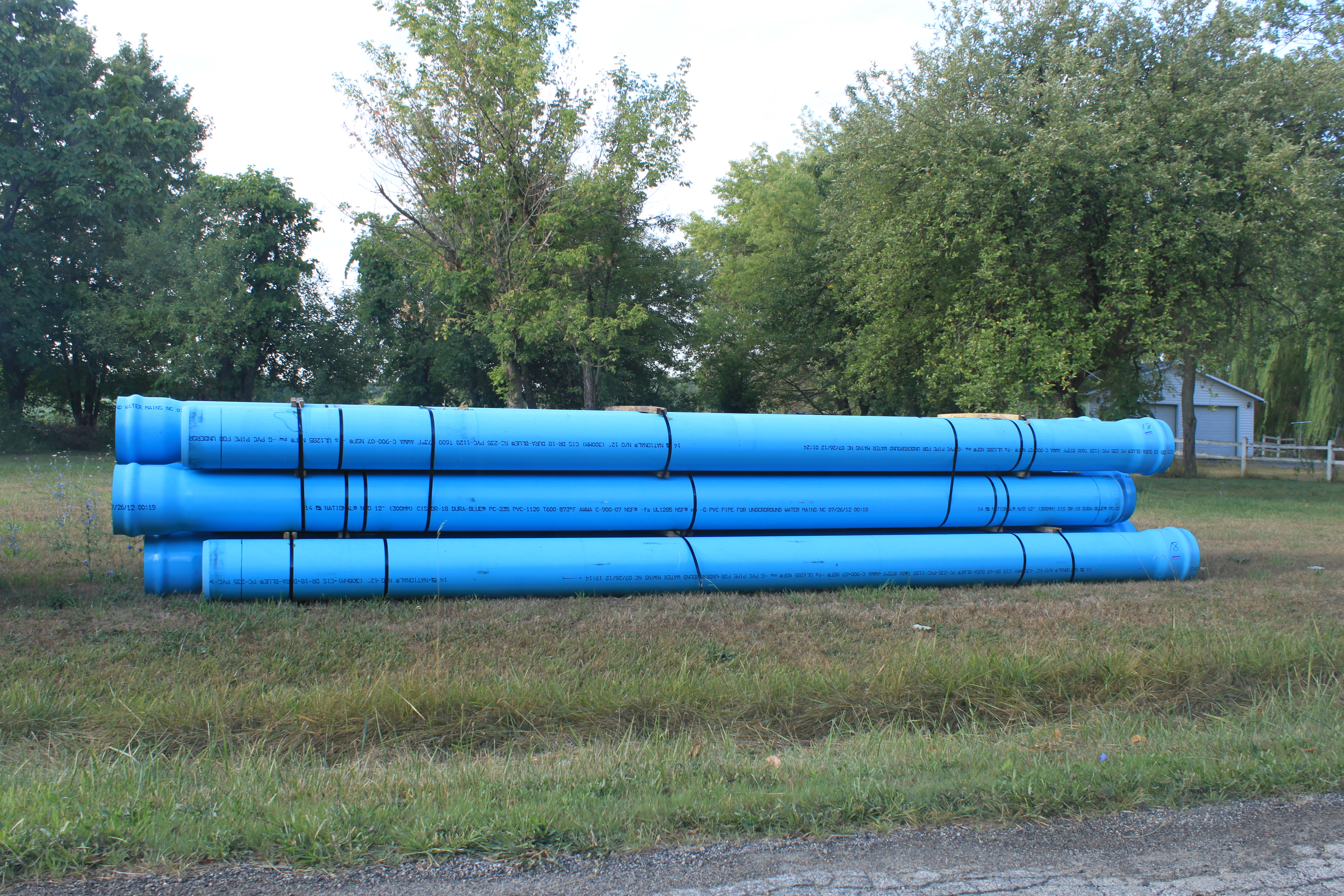
Unplasticized polyvinyl chloride pipe for underground water mains

uPVC or PVC-U, is a thermoplastic material derived from common salt and fossil fuels. The pipe material has the longest track record of all plastic materials. The first uPVC pipes were made in the 1930s. Beginning in the 1950s, uPVC pipes were used to replace corroded metal pipes and thus bring fresh drinking water to a growing rural and later urban population. uPVC pipes are certified safe for drinking water per NSF Standard 61 and used extensively for water distribution and transmission pipelines throughout North America and around the world. uPVC is allowed for waste lines in homes and is the most often used pipe for sanitary sewers.

Further pressure and non-pressure applications in the field of sewers, soil and waste, gas (low pressure) and cable protection soon followed. The material's contribution to public health, hygiene and well-being has therefore been significant.

Polyvinyl chloride or uPVC (unplasticized polyvinyl chloride) pipes are not well suited for hot water lines and have been restricted from inside water supply line use in the US for homes since 2006. Code IRC P2904.5 uPVC Not listed.

uPVC has high chemical resistance across its operating temperature range, with a broad band of operating pressures. Max operating temperature is reported at 140 °F (60 °C), and max working pressure: 450 psi (3,100 kPa). Due to its long-term strength characteristics, high stiffness and cost effectiveness, uPVC systems account for a large proportion of plastic piping installations and some estimations put it that greater than 2,000,000 miles (3,200,000 km) of uPVC pipe are currently in service across applications.

=== uPVC variants ===
Based on the standard polyvinyl chloride material, three other variants are in use.

One variant called OPVC, or PVCO, represents an important landmark in the history of plastic pipe technology. This molecular-oriented bi-axial high performance version combines higher strength with extra impact resistance.

A ductile variant is the MPVC, polyvinyl chloride modified with acrylics or chlorinated PE. This more ductile material with high fracture resistance is used in higher-demand applications where resistance against cracking and stress corrosion is important. In several studies the long track record of uPVC pipes has been investigated. Recent investigations at the German KRV and the Dutch TNO have confirmed that uPVC water pressure pipes, when installed correctly have a useful life span of over 100 years.

== Characteristics ==
=== Longevity of plastic piping systems ===
Plastic pipes have been used in service for over 50 years. The predicted lifetime of plastic piping systems exceeds 100 years. Several industry studies have demonstrated this prognosis.

Plastic pipe materials have always been classified on the basis of long-term pressure testing. The measured failure times as a function of the stresses in the pipe wall has been demonstrated in so-called Regression Curves.

An extrapolation based on measured failure times has been calculated to reach 50 years. The predicted failure stress at 50 years was taken as a basis for the classification. This value is called MRS, Minimum Required Stress, at 50 years.

=== Pipe system failure ===
Some reasons why plastic piping systems may fail are poor product bonding/gluing during installation and naturally occurring physical damage, such as from tree root infiltration. Plastic pipes were also found to fail more often during dry, hot summers.

=== Flexibility ===
Plastic Pipes are classified by their ring stiffness. The preferred stiffness classes as described in several product standards are: SN2, SN4, SN8 and SN16, where SN is Nominal Stiffness (kN/m2). Stiffness of pipes is important if they are to withstand external loadings during installation. The higher the figure, the stiffer the pipe.

After correct installation, pipe deflection remains limited but it will continue to some extent for a while. In relation to the soil in which it is embedded, the plastic pipe behaves in a 'flexible' way. This means that further deflection in time depends on the settlement of the soil around the pipe.

Basically, the pipe follows the soil movement or settlement of the backfill, as technicians call it. This means that good installation of pipes will result in good soil settlement. Further deflection will remain limited.

For flexible pipes, the soil loading is distributed and supported by the surrounding soil. Stresses and strains caused by the deflection of the pipe will occur within the pipe wall. However, the induced stresses will never exceed the allowed limit values.

The thermoplastic behavior of the pipe material is such that the induced stresses are relaxing to a low level. Induced strains are far below the allowable levels.

This flexible behaviour means that the pipe will not fail. It will exhibit only more deflection while keeping its function without breaking.

However, rigid pipes by their very nature are not flexible and will not follow ground movements. They will bear all the ground loadings, whatever the soil settlement. This means that when a rigid pipe is subject to excessive loading, it will reach the limit for stress values more quickly and break.

It can therefore be concluded that the flexibility of plastic pipes offers an extra dimension of safety. Buried Pipes need flexibility.

== Components of plastic pressure pipe systems ==
Pipes, fittings, valves, and accessories make up a plastic pressure pipe system. The range of pipe diameters for each pipe system does vary. However, the size ranges from 12 to 400 mm (0.472 to 15.748 in) and 3/8 to 16 in (9.53 to 406.40 mm). Pipes are extruded and are generally available in: 3 m (9.84 ft), 4 m (13.12 ft), 5 m (16.40 ft), and 6 m (19.69 ft) straight lengths and 25 m (82.02 ft), 50 m (164.04 ft), 100 m (328.08 ft), and 200 m (656.17 ft) coils for LDPE and HDPE.

Pipe fittings are moulded and come in many sizes: tee 90° equal (straight and reducing), tee 45°, cross equal, elbow 90° (straight and reducing), elbow 45°, short radius bend 90° socket/coupler (straight and reducing), union, end caps, reducing bush, and stub, full face, and blanking flanges. Valves are moulded and also come in many types: ball valves (also multiport valve), butterfly valves, spring-, ball-, and swing-check non-return valves, diaphragm valves, knife gate valve, globe valves and pressure relief/reduction valves. Accessories are solvents, cleaners, glues, clips, backing rings, and gaskets.

== See also ==
- HDPE Pipe
- Pipe support
- Piping
- Reinforced thermoplastic pipe
