= Blast gate =

Air flow control device

A blast gate is a gate valve used to focus a dust collection system's vacuum pressure for maximum dust (or other material) extraction at the desired location. Blast gates are positioned near individual pieces of machinery and operate by being closed by default, blocking air flow. When one blast gate is opened, all available suction is focused at that location, maximizing the amount of material collected.

In larger dust collection system installations with more available power, multiple blast gates may be opened at the same time without detriment to collection abilities at individual locations. Some systems are so powerful that at least one blast gate must be open at all times, or the system can collapse itself.
