= Ball valve =

Flow-control device

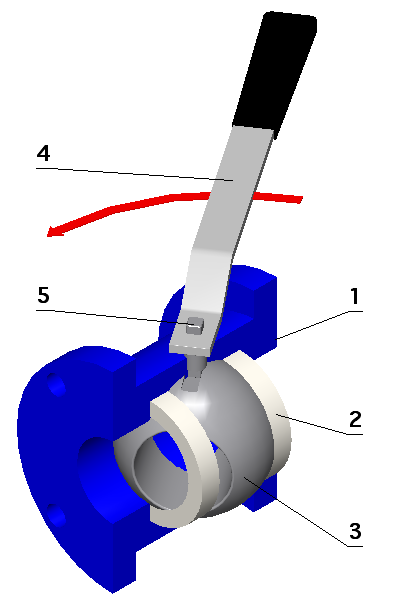
Cut-away view of ball valve components: 1. Body; 2. Seat; 3. Floating ball; 4. Lever handle; 5. Stem

A ball valve, also known as cone valve, is a flow control device which operates using a spherical ball with a hole (also known as a bore) through the middle. When the valve handle is turned, the ball rotates to align the bore with the flow path—allowing fluid to pass through. When turned 90 degrees, the solid side of the ball blocks the flow entirely, creating an airtight seal. By convention, the handle lies flat in alignment with the flow when open and is perpendicular to it when closed, making for easy visual confirmation of the valve's status. The shut position 1/4 turn could be in either clockwise or counter-clockwise direction.

Ball valves are durable, performing well after many cycles, and reliable, closing securely even after long periods of disuse. These qualities make them an excellent choice for shutoff and control applications, where they are often preferred to gates and globe valves, but they lack the fine control of those alternatives in throttling applications.

The ball valve's ease of operation, repair, and versatility lend it to extensive industrial use, supporting pressures up to 1,000 bar (100 MPa; 15,000 psi) and temperatures up to 750 °F (400 °C), depending on design and materials used. Sizes typically range from 0.2 to 48 in (5 to 1200 mm). Valve bodies are made of metal, plastic, or metal with a ceramic; floating balls are often chrome plated for durability. One disadvantage of a ball valve is that when used for controlling water flow, they trap water in the center cavity while in the closed position. In the event of ambient temperatures falling below freezing point, the sides can crack due to the expansion associated with ice formation. Some means of insulation or heat tape in this situation will usually prevent damage. Another option for cold climates is the "freeze tolerant ball valve". This style of ball valve incorporates a freeze plug in the side so in the event of a freeze-up, the freeze plug ruptures, acting as a 'sacrificial' fail point, allowing an easier repair. Instead of replacing the whole valve, all that is required is the fitting of a new freeze plug.

For cryogenic fluids, or product that may expand inside of the ball, there is a vent drilled into the upstream side of the valve. This is referred to as a vented ball.

A ball valve should not be confused with a "ball-check valve", a type of check valve that uses a solid ball to prevent undesired backflow.

Other types of quarter-turn valves include the butterfly valve and plug valve and freeze proof ball valve.

== Types ==
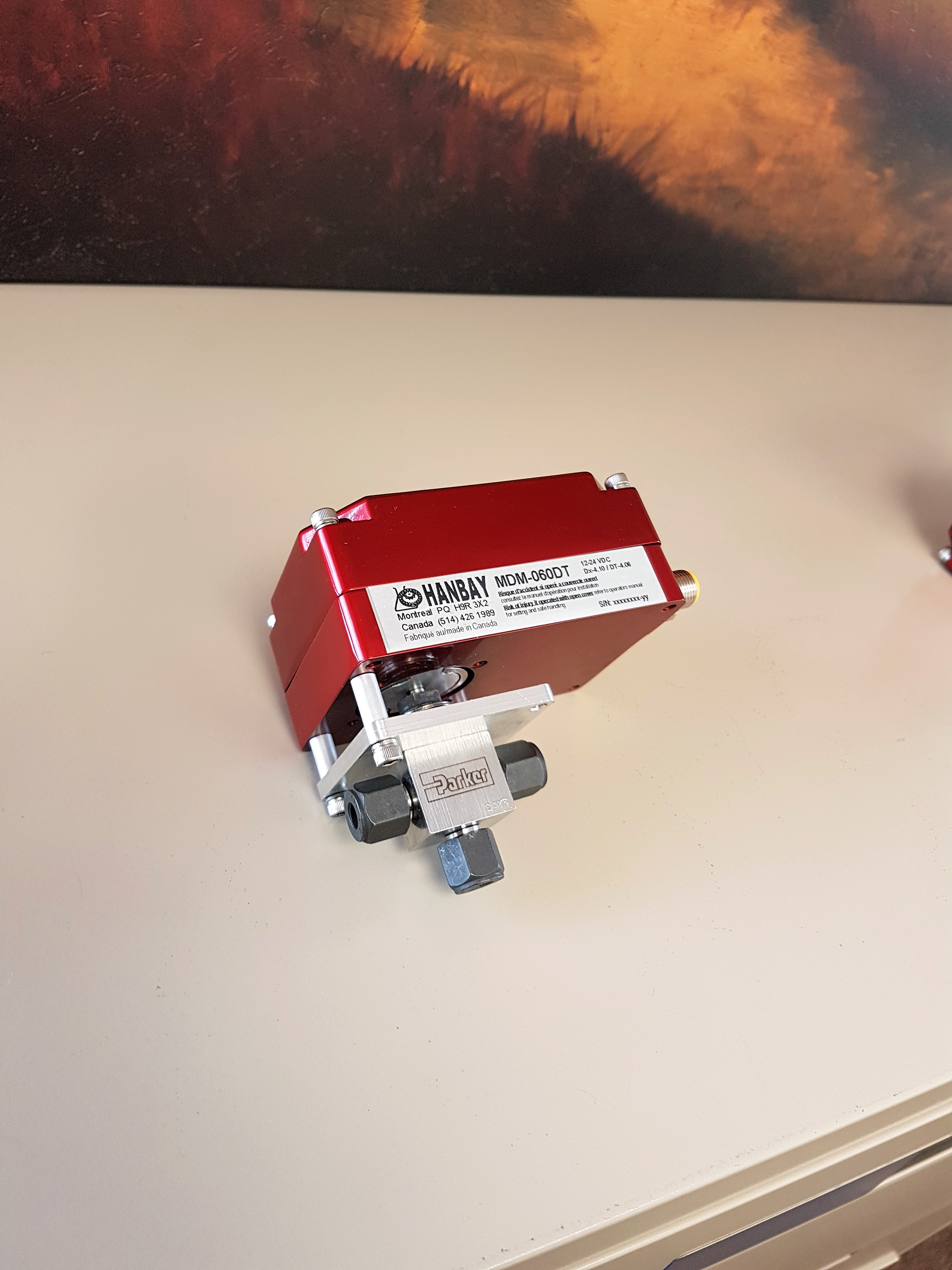
Automated three-way ball valve

There are five general body styles of ball valves: single body, three-piece body, split body, top entry, and welded. The difference is based on how the pieces of the valve—especially the casing that contains the ball itself—are manufactured and assembled. The valve operation is the same in each case.

The one-piece bodies provide a very rigid construction, in some versions the ball is removable from the valve without taking the entire valve out of the line however multi-piece bodies offer greater scope for ingenuity of design.

In addition, there are different styles related to the bore of the ball mechanism itself. And depending on the working pressure, the ball valves are categorized as low-pressure ball valves and high-pressure ball valves. In most industries, the ball valves with working pressures higher than 3,000 psi (210 bar) are considered high-pressure ball valves. Usually the maximum working pressure for the high-pressure ball valves is 7,500 psi (520 bar) and depends on the structure, sizes and sealing materials. The maximum working pressure of high-pressure ball valves can be up to 15,000 psi (1,000 bar). High-pressure ball valves are often used in hydraulic systems, so they are also known as hydraulic ball valves.

Ball valves in sizes up to 2 inches (51 mm) generally come in a single piece, two or three-piece designs. One-piece ball valves are almost always reduced bore, are relatively inexpensive, and are generally replaced instead of repaired. Two-piece ball valves generally have a slightly reduced (or standard) bore, and can be either throw-away or repairable. The three-piece design allows for the center part of the valve containing the ball, stem and seats to be easily removed from the pipeline. This facilitates efficient cleaning of deposited sediments, replacement of seats and gland packings, polishing out of small scratches on the ball, all this without removing the pipes from the valve body. The design concept of a three-piece valve is for it to be repairable. Each valve is heated to a certain degree, while the excess material is trimmed from the body.

=== Full bore ===
A full bore (sometimes full port) ball valve has an oversized ball so that the hole in the ball is the same size as the pipeline resulting in lower friction loss. Flow is unrestricted but the valve is larger and more expensive so this is only used where free flow is required, for example in pipelines that require pigging.

=== Reduced bore, or reduced port ===
In reduced bore (sometimes reduced port) ball valves, flow through the valve is one pipe size smaller than the valve's pipe size resulting in the flow area being smaller than the pipe. As the flow discharge remains constant and is equal to the area of flow (A) times velocity (V), $A_1 V_1 = A_2 V_2$ the velocity increases with reduced area of flow.

=== V port ===
A V port ball valve has either a 'v' shaped ball or a 'v' shaped seat. This allows for linear and even equal percentage flow characteristics. When the valve is in the closed position and opening is commenced the small end of the 'v' is opened first allowing stable flow control during this stage. This type of design requires a generally more robust construction due to higher velocities of the fluids, which might damage a standard valve. When machined correctly these are excellent control valves, offering superior leakage performance.

=== Cavity filler ===
Many industries encounter problems with residues in the ball valve. Where the fluid is meant for human consumption, residues may also be a health hazard, and where the fluid changes from time to time contamination of one fluid with another may occur. Residues arise because in the half-open position of the ball valve a gap is created between the ball bore and the body in which fluid can be trapped. To avoid the fluid getting into this cavity, the cavity has to be plugged, which can be done by extending the seats in such a manner that it is always in contact with the ball. This type of ball valve is known as Cavity Filler Ball Valve.

There are a few types of ball valves related to the attachment and lateral movement of the ball:

=== Trunnion, floating and actuated ===
A trunnion ball valve has additional mechanical anchoring of the ball at the top and the bottom, suitable for larger and higher pressure valves (generally above 3.9 in (10 cm) and 580 psi (40 bar)).

A floating ball valve is one where the ball is not held in place by a trunnion. In normal operation, this will cause the ball to float downstream slightly. This causes the seating mechanism to compress under the ball pressing against it. Furthermore, in some types, in the event of some force causing the seat mechanism to dissipate (such as extreme heat from fire outside the valve), the ball will float all the way to metal body which is designed to seal against the ball providing a somewhat failsafe design.

Manually operated ball valves can be closed quickly and thus there is a danger of water hammer. Some ball valves are equipped with an actuator that may be pneumatically, hydraulically or motor operated. These valves can be used either for on/off or flow control. A pneumatic flow control valve is also equipped with a positioner which transforms the control signal into actuator position and valve opening accordingly.

=== Multiport ===
Schematic 3 way ball valve: L-shaped ball right, T-shaped left

- Three- and four-way have an L- or T-shaped hole through the middle. The different combinations of flow are shown in the figure. It is easy to see that a T valve can connect any pair of ports, or all three, together, but the 45 degree position which might disconnect all three leaves no margin for error. The L valve can connect the center port to either side port, or disconnect all three, but it cannot connect the side ports together.
- Multi-port ball valves with 4 ways, or more, are also commercially available, the inlet way often being orthogonal to the plane of the outlets. For special applications, such as driving air-powered motors from forward to reverse, the operation is performed by rotating a single lever four-way valve. The 4-way ball valve has two L-shaped ports in the ball that do not interconnect, sometimes referred to as an "×" port.

== Materials of construction ==
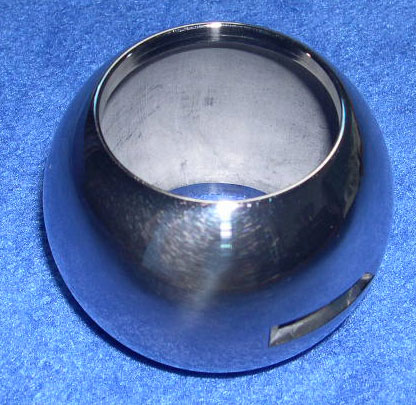
Ball for a titanium ball valve

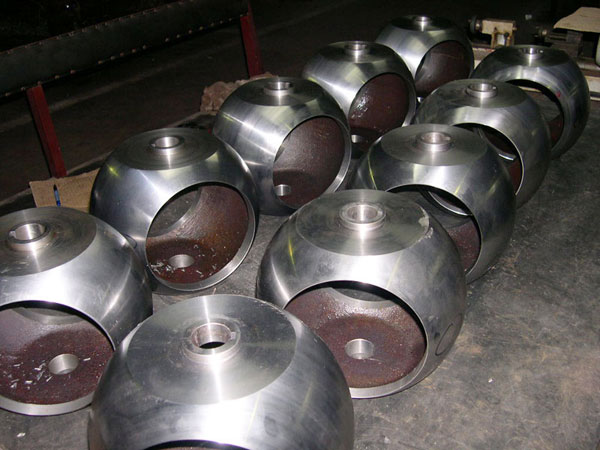
Balls for alloy ball valves

Body materials may include, but are not limited to, any of these materials:

- Stainless steel
- Brass
- Bronze
- Chrome
- Titanium
- PVC
- CPVC
- PFA-lined

There are many different types of seats and seals that are used in ball valves as well. Valves are usually manufactured with different materials, each with specific applications they are good for due to their chemical compatibility, pressures, and temperatures. Some of the commonly used materials include brass, stainless steel, bronze etc. These material choices ensure that valves are suitable for their respective functions, providing efficient and reliable performance in various industries and applications.

- TMF (valve seat)
- Delrin
- Reinforced PTFE (RTFE)
- Polychlorotrifluoroethylene (PCTFE; Kel F)
- Metal
- Nylon
- PEEK
- 50/50 (valve seat)
- Virgin (unfilled) PTFE
- Ultra-high-molecular-weight polyethylene (UHMWPE)
- Graphoil
- Viton

== See also ==
- Butterfly valve
- Control valve
- Gate valve
- Globe valve
- Hydrogen valve
- Needle valve
- Pinch valve
- Piston valve
- Plastic pressure pipe systems
- Thermal expansion
