= Butterfly valve =

Flow control device

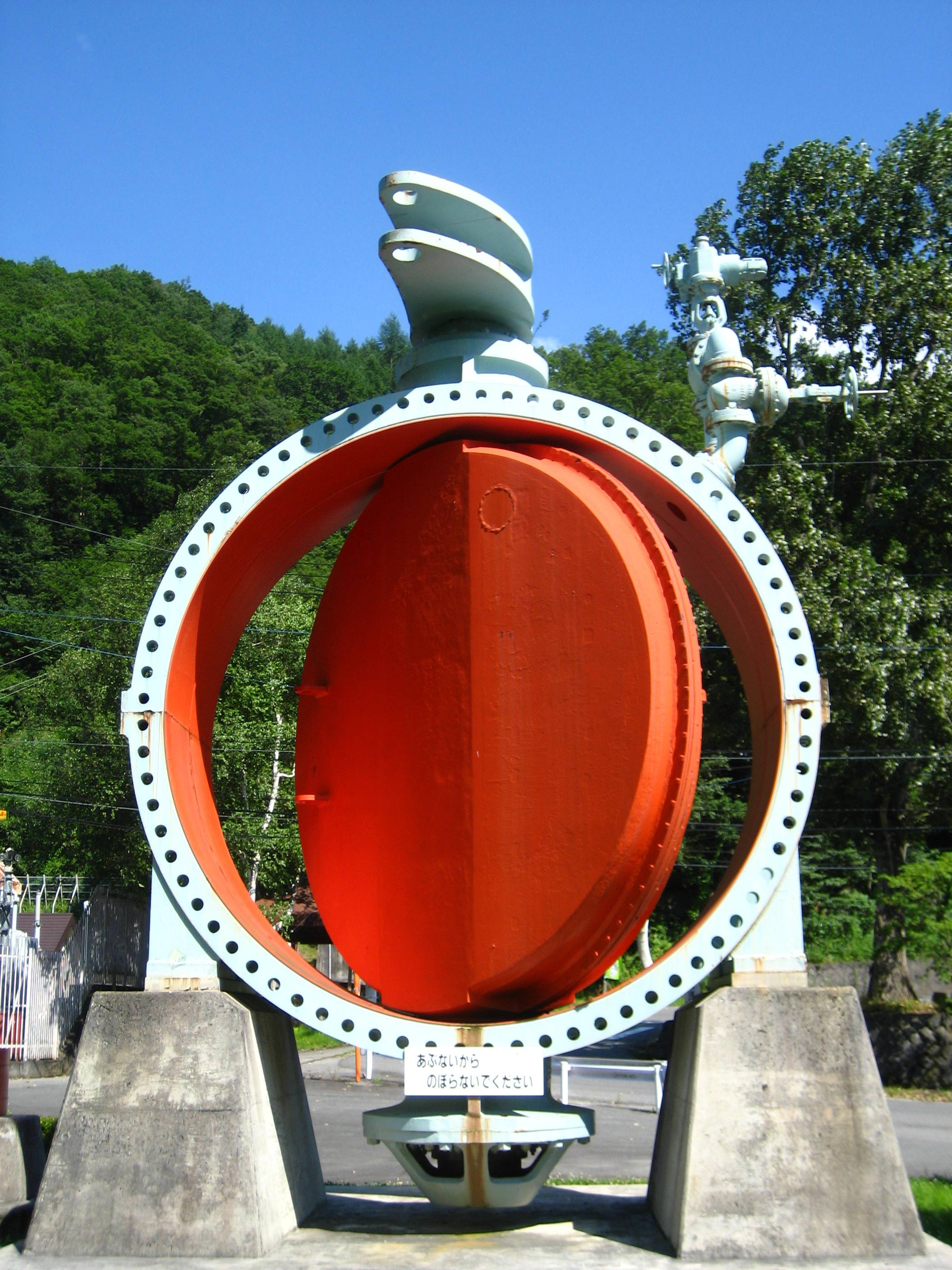
Large butterfly valve used on a hydroelectric power station water inlet pipe in Japan.

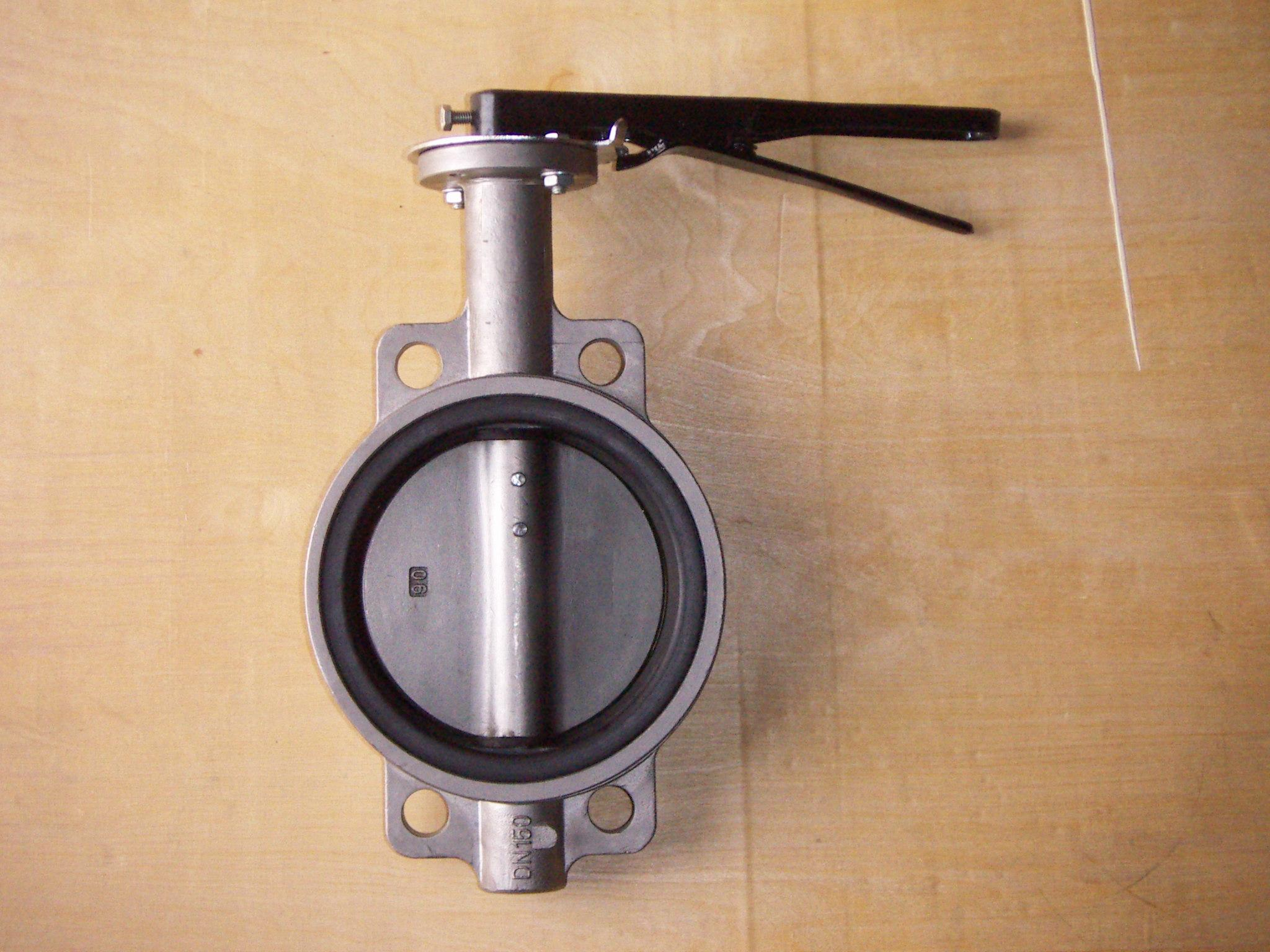
Duplex valve in wafer butterfly configuration.

A butterfly valve is a valve that isolates or regulates the flow of a fluid. The closing mechanism is a disk that rotates.

== Principle of operation ==
Operation is similar to that of a ball valve, which allows for quick shut off. Butterfly valves are generally favored because they cost less than other valve designs, and are lighter weight so they need less support. The disc is positioned in the center of the pipe. A rod passes through the disc to an actuator on the outside of the valve. Rotating the actuator turns the disc either parallel or perpendicular to the flow. Unlike a ball valve, the disc is always present within the flow, so it induces a pressure drop, even when open.

A butterfly valve is from a family of valves called quarter-turn valves. In operation, the valve is fully open or closed when the disc is rotated a quarter turn. The "butterfly" is a metal disc mounted on a rod. When the valve is closed, the disc is turned so that it completely blocks off the passageway. When the valve is fully open, the disc is rotated a quarter turn so that it allows an almost unrestricted passage of the fluid. The valve may also be opened incrementally to throttle flow.

There are different kinds of butterfly valves, each adapted for different pressures and different usage. The zero-offset butterfly valve, which uses the flexibility of rubber, has the lowest pressure rating. The high-performance double offset butterfly valve, used in slightly higher-pressure systems, is offset from the center line of the disc seat and body seal (offset one), and the center line of the bore (offset two). This creates a cam action during operation to lift the seat out of the seal resulting in less friction than is created in the zero offset design and decreases its tendency to wear. The valve best suited for high-pressure systems is the triple offset butterfly valve. In this valve, the disc seat contact axis is offset, which acts to virtually eliminate sliding contact between disc and seat. In the case of triple offset valves the seat is made of metal so that it can be machined such as to achieve a bubble-tight shut-off when in contact with the disc.

== Types ==
1. Concentric butterfly valves – this type of valve has a resilient rubber seat with a metal disc.
2. Doubly-eccentric butterfly valves (high-performance butterfly valves or double-offset butterfly valves) – different type of materials is used for seat and disc.
3. Triply-eccentric butterfly valves (triple-offset butterfly valves) – the seats are either laminated or solid metal seat design.
4. Butterfly valve with actuator electric valve - An electrically actuated butterfly valve is a quarter-turn valve controlled by an electric motor. It offers fast and precise flow regulation, remote operation, and versatility for various applications.

=== Wafer-style butterfly valve ===
The wafer style butterfly valve is designed to maintain a seal against bi-directional pressure differential to prevent any backflow in systems designed for unidirectional flow. It accomplishes this with a tightly fitting seal; i.e., gasket, precision machined, and a flat valve face on the upstream and downstream sides of the valve.the drawback is that wafer butterfly valves only have a small flow control range. The pressure drop across wafer butterfly valves may be greater. Wafer butterfly valves are prone to clogging due to their design.

=== Lug-style butterfly valve ===
Lug-style valves have threaded inserts at both sides of the valve body. This allows them to be installed into a system using two sets of bolts and no nuts. The valve is installed between two flanges using a separate set of bolts for each flange. This setup permits either side of the piping system to be disconnected without disturbing the other side.

A lug-style butterfly valve used in dead end service generally has a reduced pressure rating. For example, a lug-style butterfly valve mounted between two flanges has a 1,000 kPa (150 psi) pressure rating. The same valve mounted with one flange, in dead end service, has a 520 kPa (75 psi) rating. Lugged valves are extremely resistant to chemicals and solvents and can handle temperatures up to 200 °C, which makes it a versatile solution.

=== Rotary valve ===
Rotary valves constitute a derivation of the general butterfly valves and are used mainly in powder processing industries. Instead of being flat, the butterfly is equipped with pockets. When closed, it acts exactly like a butterfly valve and is tight. But when it is in the rotation, the pockets allow dropping a defined amount of solids, which makes the valve suitable for dosing bulk product by gravity. Such valves are usually of small size (less than 300 mm), pneumatically activated and rotate 180 degrees back and forth.

== Use in industry ==
In the pharmaceutical, chemical, and food industries, a butterfly valve is used to interrupt product flow (solid, liquid, gas) within the process. The valves used in these industries are usually manufactured according to cGMP guidelines (current good manufacturing practice). Butterfly valves generally replaced ball valves in many industries, particularly petroleum, due to lower cost and ease of installation, but pipelines containing butterfly valves cannot be 'pigged' for cleaning.

== History ==
The butterfly valve has been in use since the late 18th century. James Watt used a butterfly valve in his steam engine prototypes. With advances in material manufacturing and technology, butterfly valves could be made smaller and withstand more-extreme temperatures. After World War II, synthetic rubbers were used in the sealer members, allowing the butterfly valve to be used in many more industries. In 1969 James E. Hemphill patented an improvement to the butterfly valve, reducing the hydrodynamic torque needed to change the output of the valve.

== Images ==
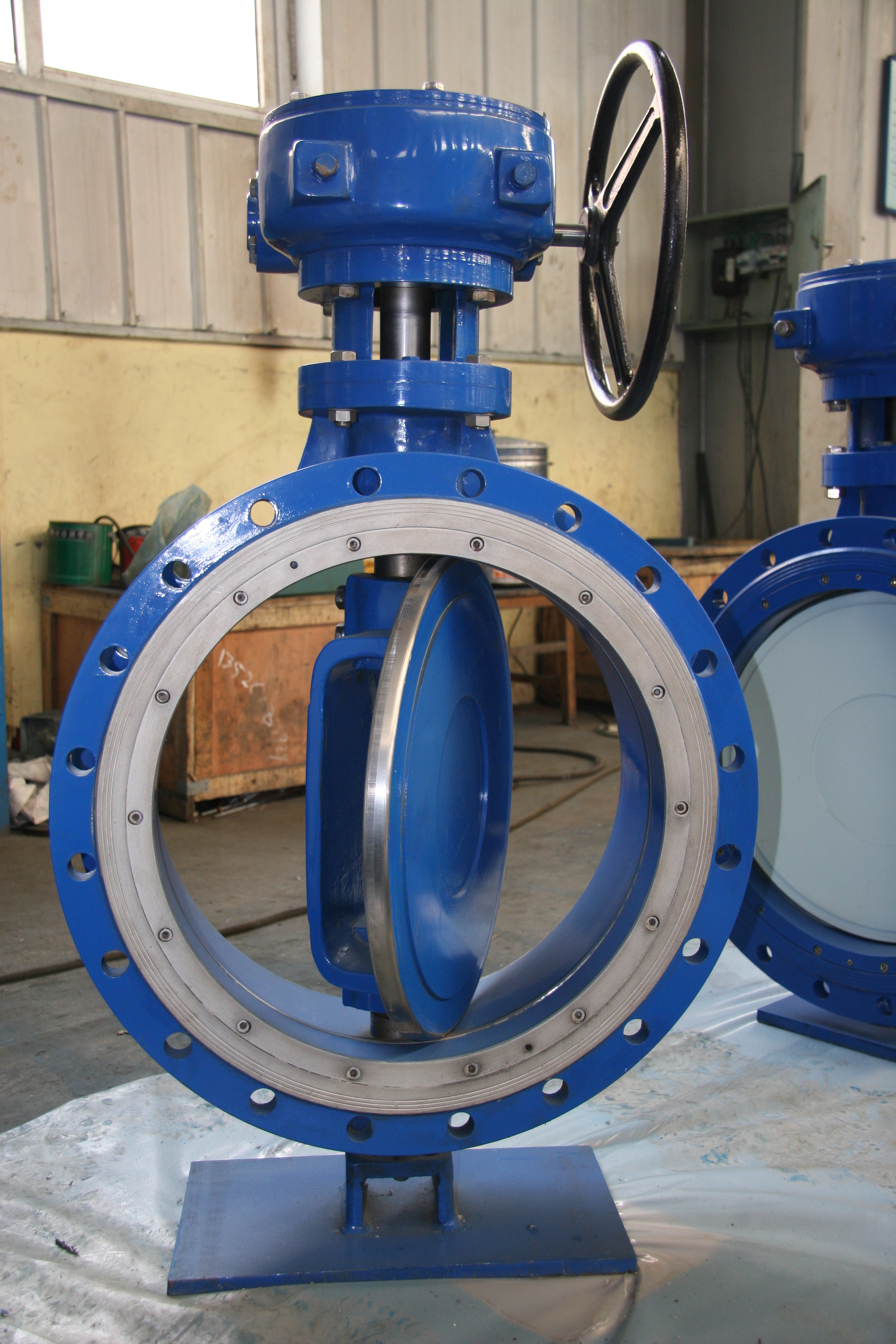
Cast iron butterfly valve

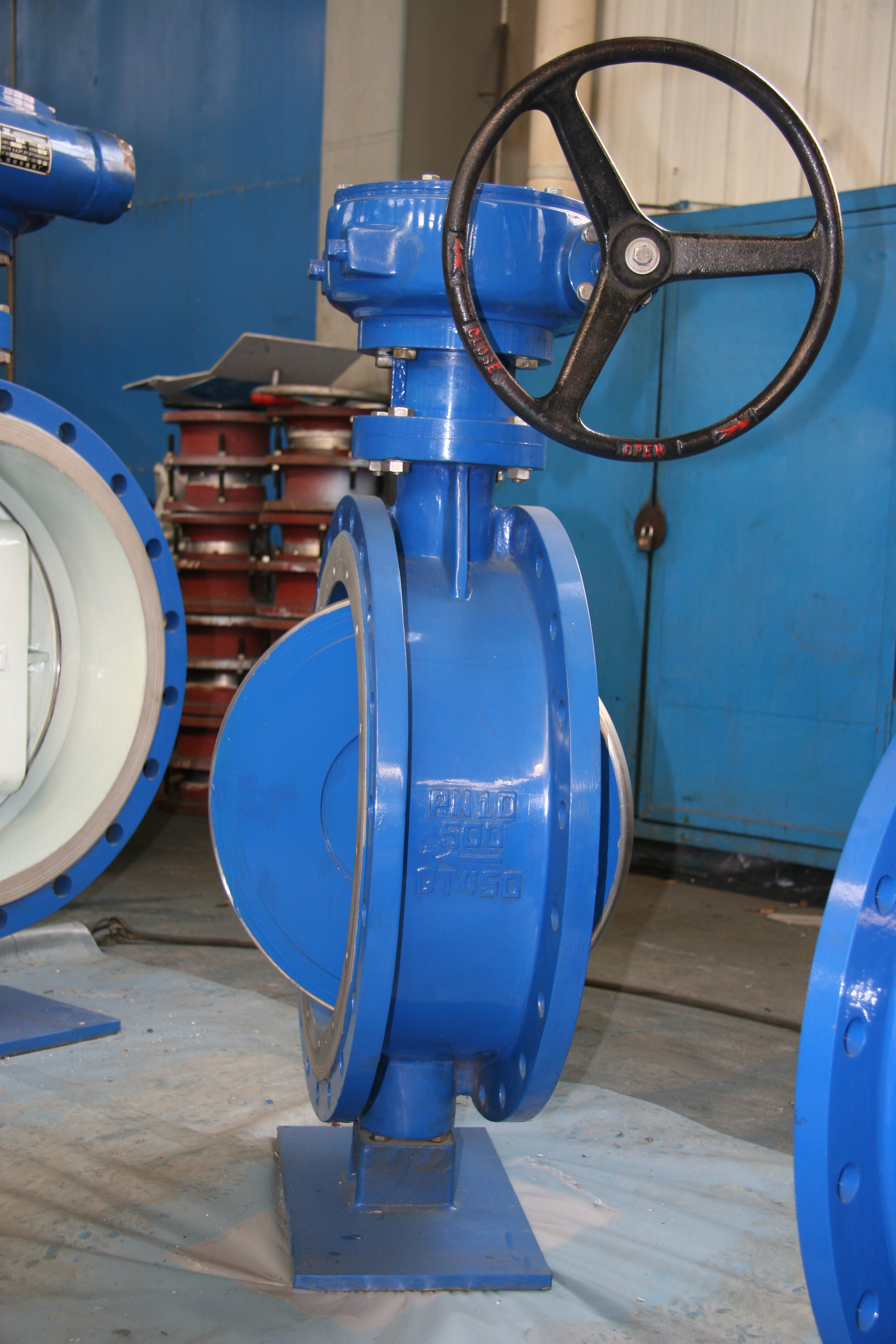
Cast iron butterfly valve

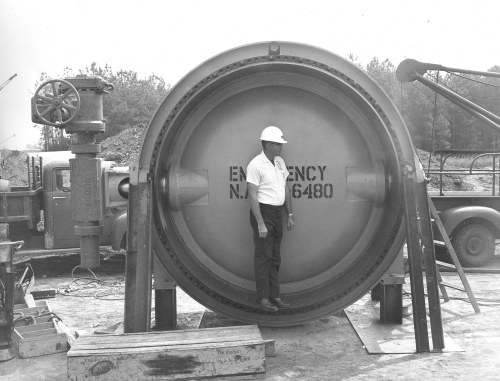
Large butterfly valve

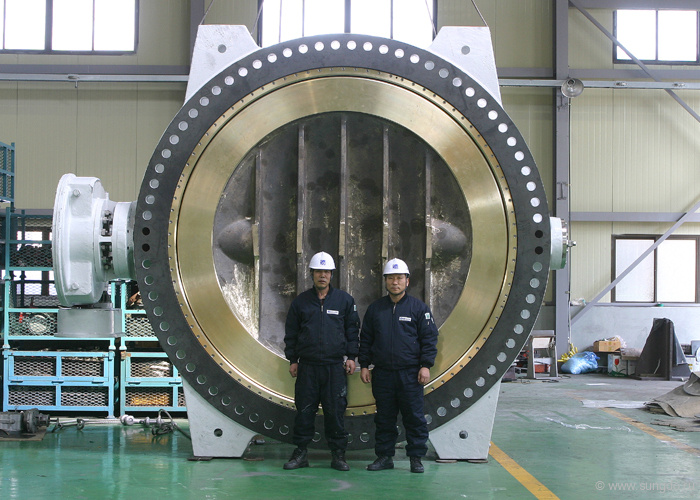
Butterfly valve DN3000

== See also ==
- Check valve
- Control valve
- Diaphragm valve
- Gate valve
- Globe valve
- Needle valve
- Plastic pressure pipe systems
