= Four-way valve =

Flow-control device

Two flow positions on a four-way rotary valve

The four-way valve, or four-way cock, is a fluid control valve whose body has four ports.

One commonly used form—the rotary four-way valve—has equally spaced ports around the valve chamber and a plug with two passages that connect pairs of adjacent ports. The plug may be cylindrical, tapered, or a ball. It has two flow positions, and usually a central position where all ports are closed.

An application of this design is to isolate and to simultaneously bypass a sampling cylinder installed on a pressurized water line. It is useful to take a fluid sample without affecting the pressure of a hydraulic system and to avoid degassing (no leak, no gas loss or air entry, no external contamination).

Another common use case is to reverse the flow of fluid through some portion of a system. An example is a reversible heat pump, where a four-way valve reconnects the two heat exchangers to be either evaporator or condenser. It was used to control the flow of steam in the valve gear of early double-acting steam engines, such as those designed by Richard Trevithick. This use of the valve is possibly attributable to Denis Papin.

Because the two passages in the plug are somewhat L-shaped and do not interconnect, the four-way valve is sometimes called an × port.

== See also ==
- Ball valve
