= Globe valve =

Flow control device

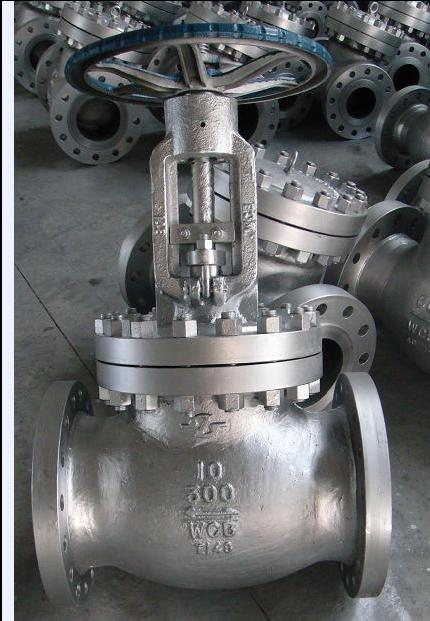
Globe valve

A globe valve is a type of valve used for regulating flow in a pipeline, consisting of a movable plug or disc element and a stationary ring seat in a generally spherical body.

The globe valve is named for its historical spherical internal body shape, with the two halves of the body being separated by an internal baffle, and is not to be confused with a ball valve, which uses a pivoting internal spherical ball to control flow. A globe valve incorporates a seat onto which a movable plug can be screwed in to close (or shut) the valve. The plug is also called a disc. In globe valves, the plug is connected to a stem which is operated by screw action using a handwheel in manual valves. Typically, automated globe valves use smooth stems rather than threaded and are opened and closed by an actuator assembly.

== Name ==
Although globe valves in the past had the spherical bodies which gave them their name, many modern globe valves do not have much of a spherical shape. However, the term globe valve is still often used for valves that have such an internal mechanism. In plumbing, valves with such a mechanism are also often called stop valves since they don't have the spherical housing, but the term stop valve may refer to valves which are used to stop flow even when they have other mechanisms or designs.

== Parts ==
=== Body ===
Internal parts of a typical globe valve

The body is the main pressure-containing structure of the valve and the most easily identified as it forms the mass of the valve. It contains all of the valve's internal parts that will come in contact with the substance being controlled by the valve. The bonnet is connected to the body and provides the containment of the fluid, gas, or slurry that is being controlled.

Globe valves are typically two-port valves, although three-port valves are also produced mostly in straight-flow configuration. Ports are openings in the body for fluid flowing in or out. The two ports may be oriented straight across from each other or anywhere on the body, or oriented at an angle (such as a 90°). Globe valves with ports at such an angle are called angle globe valves. Globe valves are mainly used for corrosive or highly viscous fluids that solidify at room temperature. This is because straight valves are designed so that the outlet pipe is in line with the inlet pipe and the fluid has a good chance of staying there in the case of horizontal piping. In the case of angle valves, the outlet pipe is directed towards the bottom. This allows the fluid to drain off. In turn, this prevents clogging and/or corrosion of the valve components over a period of time. A globe valve can also have a body in the shape of a "Y". This will allow the construction of the valve to be straight at the bottom as opposed to the conventional pot-type construction (to arrange bottom seat) in case of other valves. This will again allow the fluid to pass through without difficulty and minimizes fluid clogging/corrosion in the long term.

=== Bonnet ===
The bonnet provides a leak-proof closure for the valve body. The threaded section of the stem goes through a hole with matching threads in the bonnet. Globe valves may have a screw-in, union, or bolted bonnet. Screw-in bonnet is the simplest bonnet, offering a durable, pressure-tight seal.

=== Plug or disc ===
The valve's closure mechanism involves plugs that connect to a stem, which is adjusted either by sliding or screwing it up or down to regulate flow. Plugs come in balanced or unbalanced types. Unbalanced plugs, typically solid, are suitable for smaller valves or those with low pressure drops. They offer advantages such as simpler design, with potential leakage only at the seat, and usually lower cost. However, they are limited in size, as larger unbalanced plugs may require impractical forces to seal and control flow. On the other hand, balanced plugs feature holes through the plug itself. They offer advantages such as easier shut-off due to reduced static forces required. However, they introduce a second potential leak path between the plug and the cage, and they tend to be more expensive.

=== Stem ===
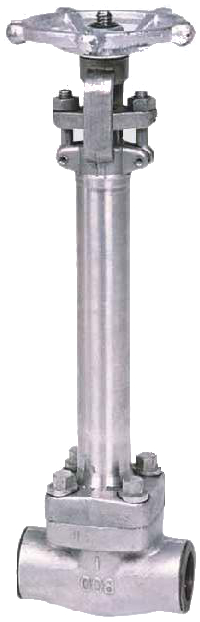
Long-stemmed globe valve

The stem serves as a connector from the actuator to the inside of the valve and transmits this actuation force. Stems are either smooth for actuator-controlled valves or threaded for manual valves. The smooth stems are surrounded by packing material to prevent leaking material from the valve. This packing is a wearable material and will have to be replaced during maintenance. With a smooth stem the ends are threaded to allow connection to the plug and the actuator. The stem must not only withstand a large amount of compression force during valve closure, but also have high tensile strength during valve opening. In addition, the stem must be very straight, or have low run-out, in order to ensure good valve closure. This minimum run-out also minimizes wear of the packing contained in the bonnet, which provides the seal against leakage. The stem may be provided with a shroud over the packing nut to prevent foreign bodies entering the packing material, which would accelerate wear.

=== Cage ===
The cage is a part of the valve that surrounds the plug and is located inside the body of the valve. Typically, the cage is one of the greatest determiners of flow within the valve. As the plug is moved, more of the openings in the cage are exposed and flow is increased and vice versa. The design and layout of the openings can have a large effect on flow of material (the flow characteristics of different materials at temperatures, pressures that are in a range). Cages are also used to guide the plug to the seat of the valve for a good shutoff, substituting the guiding from the bonnet.

=== Seat ===
The seat ring provides a stable, uniform and replaceable shut-off surface. The seat is usually screwed in or torqued. This pushes the cage down on the lip of the seat and holds it firmly to the body of the valve. The seat may also be threaded and screwed into a thread cut in the same area of the body. However this method makes removal of the seat ring during maintenance difficult if not impossible. Seat rings are also typically beveled at the seating surface to allow for some guiding during the final stages of closing the valve.

Economical globe valves or stop valves with a similar mechanism used in plumbing often have a rubber washer at the bottom of the disc for the seating surface, so that rubber can be compressed against the seat to form a leak-tight seal when shut.

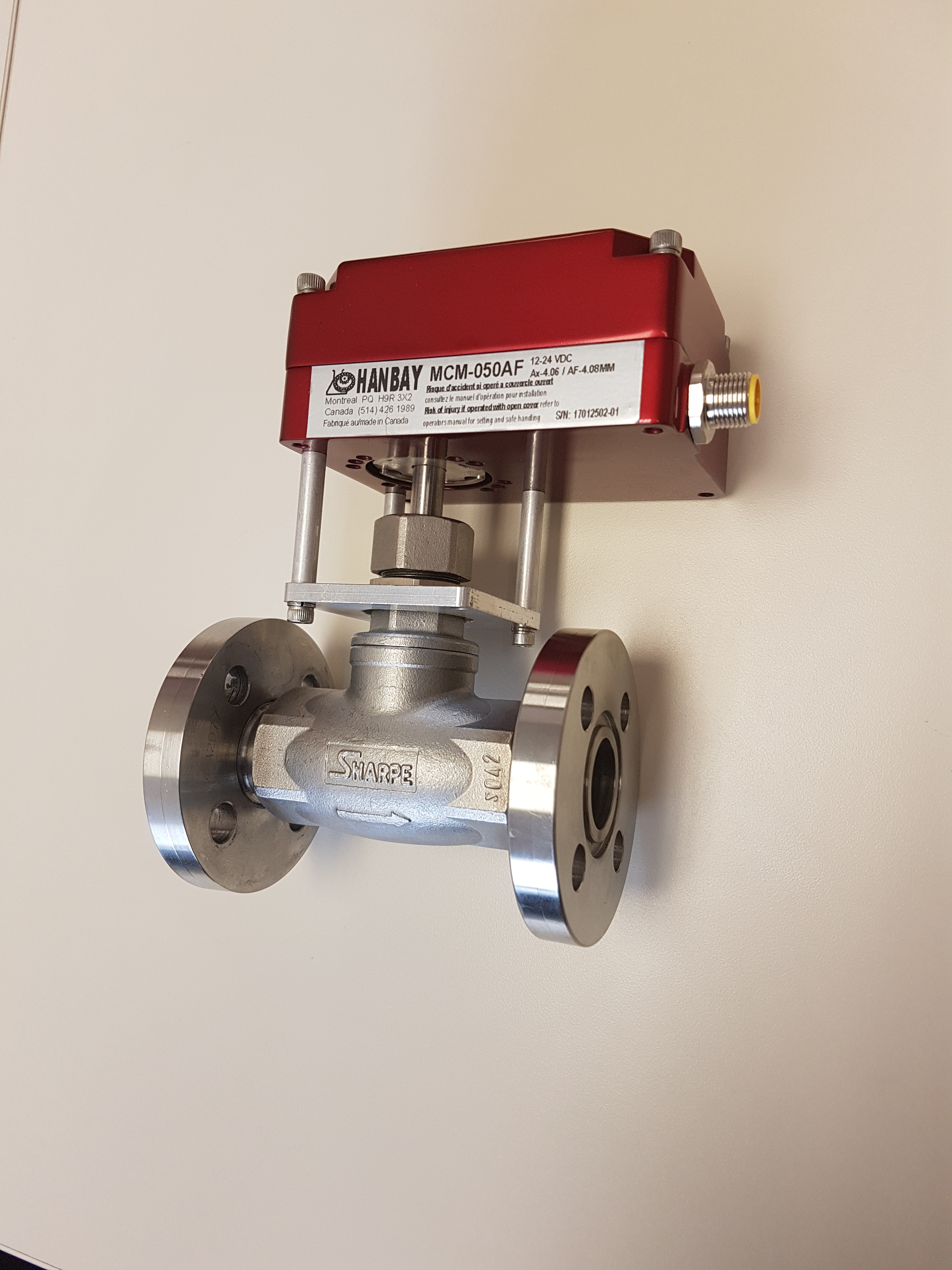
Electrically automated 3/4" flanged globe valve

== See also ==
- Ball valve
- Butterfly valve
- Control valve
- Diaphragm valve
- Gate valve
- Needle valve
- Pinch valve
