= Diaphragm valve =

Flow control device

Rubber-lined diaphragm valve

A diaphragm valve, or membrane valve, consists of a valve body with two or more ports, a flexible diaphragm, and a weir, saddle, or seat upon which the diaphragm closes the valve. The valve body may be constructed from plastic, metal or other materials depending on the intended use.

== Categories ==
There are two main categories of diaphragm valves: One type seals over a weir, or saddle, and the other (sometimes called a full-bore or straight-through valve) seals over a seat. In general, straight-through diaphragm valves are used in on-off applications and weir-type diaphragm valves are used for control or throttling applications. While diaphragm valves usually come in two-port forms (2/2-way diaphragm valve), they can also come with three ports (3/2-way diaphragm valves, also called T-valves) and more (so called block-valves). When more than three ports are included, they generally require more than one diaphragm seat; however, special dual actuators can handle more ports with one membrane.

Diaphragm valves can be manual or automated. Automated diaphragm valves may use pneumatic, hydraulic or electric actuators along with accessories such as solenoid valves, limit switches and positioners.

In addition to the well-known two-way shut-off and throttling diaphragm valves, other types include the three-way zero-deadleg valve, the sterile access port, the block and bleed valve, the valbow and the tank-bottom valve.

== Valve body ==
Many diaphragm valve body dimensions follow the Manufacturers Standardization Society MSS SP-88 However, most non-diaphragm valves used in industrial applications are built to the ANSI/ASME B16.10 standard. standard. The different standards makes it difficult to use diaphragm valves as an alternative to most other industrial valves. Some manufacturers offer diaphragm valves that conform to ANSI B16.10 standards thereby making these diaphragm valves interchangeable with most solid wedge, double disc, and resilient wedge gate valves as well as short pattern plug and ball valves.

== Actuators ==
Diaphragm valves can be controlled by various types of actuators e.g. manual, pneumatic, hydraulic, electric etc. The most common diaphragm valves use pneumatic actuators; in this type of valve, air pressure is applied through a pilot valve into the actuator which in turn raises the diaphragm and opens the valve. This type of valve is one of the more common valves used in operations where valve speed is a necessity.

Hydraulic diaphragm valves also exist for higher pressure and lower speed operations. Many diaphragm valves are also controlled manually.

== Body materials ==
- Brass
- Steel type:
  - Cast Iron
  - Ductile iron
  - Carbon Steel
  - Stainless Steel
  - Alloy 20
- Plastic type:
  - ABS (Acrylonitrile butadiene styrene)
  - PVC-U (Polyvinyl chloride, unplasticized) also known as PVCu or uPVC
  - PVC-C (Polyvinyl chloride, post chlorinated) also known as PVCc or cPVC
  - PP (Polypropylene)
  - PE (Polyethylene) also known as LDPE, MDPE and HDPE (see note)
  - PVDF (Polyvinylidene fluoride)
  - PTFE
  - PFA

== Body lining materials ==
Depending on temperature, pressure and chemical resistance, one of the following is used:

- Unlined type
- Rubber lined type:
  - NR/Hard Rubber/Ebonite,
  - BR/Soft rubber
  - EPDM
  - BUNA-N
  - Neoprene
- Fluorine plastic lined type
  - FEP
  - PFA
  - PO
  - PP
  - Tefzel
  - KYNAR
  - XYLON
  - HALAR
- Glass Lined (Green Glass or Blue Glass)

== Diaphragm materials ==
- Unlined or Rubber Lined Type:
  - NR/Natural Rubber
  - NBR/Nitrile/Buna-N
  - EPDM
  - FKM/Viton
  - BUNA-N
  - SI/Silicone rubber
  - Leather
- Fluorine Plastic Type:
  - FEP, with EPDM backing
  - PTFE, with EPDM backing
  - PFA, with EPDM backing

== Applications ==
Diaphragm Valves are ideally suited for:

- Corrosive applications, where the body and diaphragm materials can be chosen for chemical compatibility. (E.G. Acids, Bases etc.)
- Abrasive applications, where the body lining can be designed to withstand abrasion and the diaphragm can be easily replaced once worn out
- Solids entrained liquids, since the diaphragm can seal around any entrained solids and provide positive seal
- Slurries, since the diaphragm can seal around entrained solids and provide positive seal

== Markets ==
Diaphragm valves have many applications in the following markets:

- Water and Wastewater
- Power
- Pulp and Paper
- Chemical
- Cement
- Mining and Minerals
- Pharmaceutical and Bioprocessing

== See also ==
- Ball valve
- Butterfly valve
- Control valve
- Gate valve
- Globe valve
- Needle valve
- Pinch valve
