= Pinch valve =

Valve closed by squeezing a tube

A pinch valve is a full bore or fully ported type of control valve which uses a pinching effect to obstruct fluid flow.

== Operating principle ==
A pinch valve is a type of valve which employs an elastic tubing (sleeve/hose) and a device that directly contacts the tubing (body). Forcing the tubing together creates a seal that is equivalent to the tubing's permeability.

Air-operated pinch valves consist of an elasticised reinforced rubber hose, a type of housing, and two socket end covers (or flanges). In air-operated pinch valves, the rubber hoses are usually press-fitted and centered into the housing ends by the socket covers. There is no additional actuator, the valve closes as soon as there is a pressurized air supply into the body. When the air supply becomes interrupted and the volume of air exhausts, the elastic rubber hose starts to open due to the force of the process flow.

== Applications ==
Pinch valves are typically used in applications where the flowing media needs to be completely isolated from any internal valve parts. The sleeve will contain the flow media and isolate it from the environment, hence reducing contamination. They are commonly applied to medical instruments, clinical or chemical analyzers, and a wide range of laboratory equipment.

They are used in some water pistols, notably the original Super Soaker 50.

== Material selection ==
The sleeve material is selected among suitable synthetic polymer based upon the corrosiveness and abrasiveness of the flow media. A key selection criterion is the operation temperature, which needs to be within the limit of the polymer.

Several rubber qualities are available for pinch valves such as natural rubber, EPDM, nitrile, viton, neoprene and butyl. Different housings and end covers/flange materials such as aluminium, plastics and stainless steel are also available.
