= Gate valve =

Flow control device

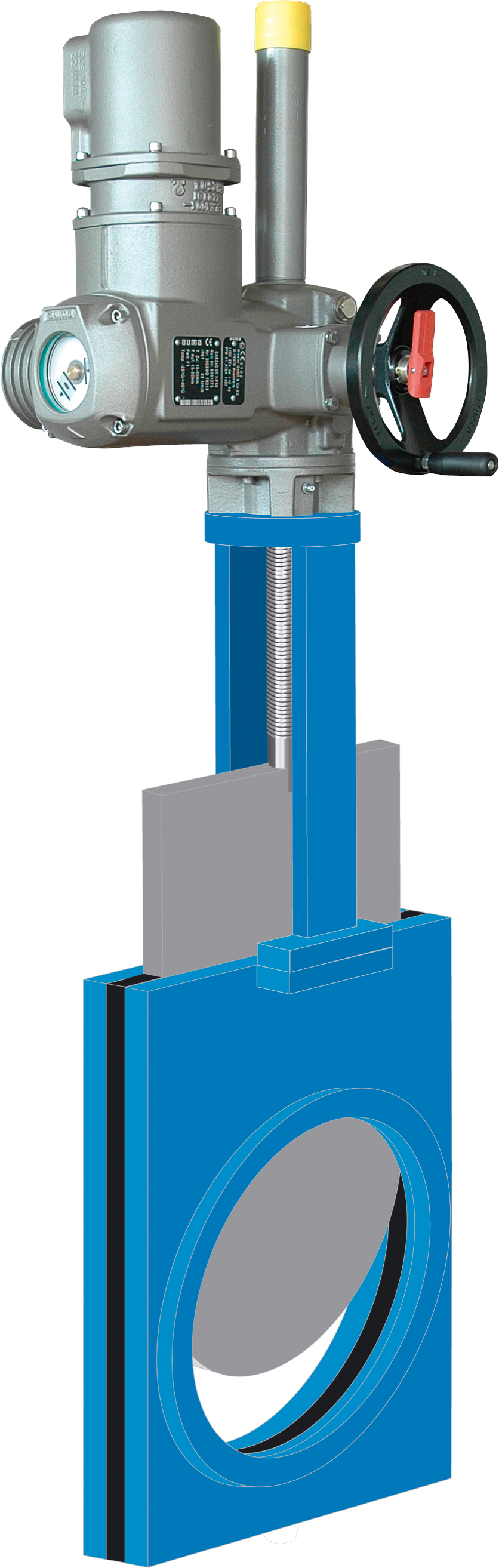
An electric multi-turn actuator on a gate valve

A gate valve, also known as a sluice valve, is a valve that opens by lifting a barrier (gate) out of the path of the fluid. Gate valves require very little space along the pipe axis and hardly restrict the flow of fluid when the gate is fully opened. The gate faces can be parallel but are most commonly wedge-shaped (in order to be able to apply pressure on the sealing surface).

== Typical use ==
Gate valves are used to shut off the flow of liquids rather than for flow regulation, which is frequently done with a globe valve. When fully open, the typical gate valve has no obstruction in the flow path, resulting in very low flow resistance. The size of the open flow path generally varies in a nonlinear manner as the gate is moved. This means that the flow rate does not change evenly with stem travel. Depending on the construction, a partially open gate can vibrate from the fluid flow.

Gate valves are mostly used with larger pipe diameters (from 2" to the largest pipelines) since they are less complex to construct than other types of valves in large sizes.

At high pressures, friction can become a problem. As the gate is pushed against its guiding rail by the pressure of the medium, it becomes harder to operate the valve. Large gate valves are sometimes fitted with a bypass controlled by a smaller valve to be able to reduce the pressure before operating the gate valve itself.

Gate valves without an extra sealing ring on the gate or the seat are used in applications where minor leaking of the valve is not an issue, such as heating circuits or sewer pipes.

== Valve construction ==
Common gate valves are actuated by a threaded stem that connects the actuator (e.g. handwheel or motor) to the gate. They are characterised as having either a rising or a nonrising stem, depending on which end of the stem is threaded. Rising stems are fixed to the gate and rise and lower together as the valve is operated, providing a visual indication of valve position. The actuator is attached to a nut that is rotated around the threaded stem to move it. Nonrising stem valves are fixed to, and rotate with, the actuator, and are threaded into the gate. They may have a pointer threaded onto the stem to indicate valve position, since the gate's motion is concealed inside the valve. Nonrising stems are used where vertical space is limited.

Gate valves may have flanged ends drilled according to pipeline-compatible flange dimensional standards.

Gate valves are typically constructed from cast iron, cast carbon steel, ductile iron, gunmetal, stainless steel, alloy steels, and forged steels.

All-metal gate valves are used in ultra-high vacuum chambers to isolate regions of the chamber.

=== Bonnet ===
Bonnets provide leakproof closure for the valve body. Gate valves may have a screw-in, union, or bolted bonnet. A screw-in bonnet is the simplest, offering a durable, pressure-tight seal. A union bonnet is suitable for applications requiring frequent inspection and cleaning. It also gives the body added strength. A bolted bonnet is used for larger valves and higher pressure applications.

==== Pressure seal bonnet ====
Another type of bonnet construction in a gate valve is pressure seal bonnet. This construction is adopted for valves for high pressure service, typically in excess of 2250 psi (15 MPa). The unique feature of the pressure seal bonnet is that the bonnet ends in a downward-facing cup that fits inside the body of the valve. As the internal pressure in the valve increases, the sides of the cup are forced outward. improving the body-bonnet seal. Other constructions where the seal is provided by external clamping pressure tend to create leaks in the body-bonnet joint.

==== Knife gate valve ====
For plastic solids and high-viscosity slurries such as paper pulp, a specialty valve known as a knife gate valve is used to cut through the material to stop the flow. A knife gate valve is usually not wedge shaped and has a tapered knife-like edge on its lower surface.

== Images ==
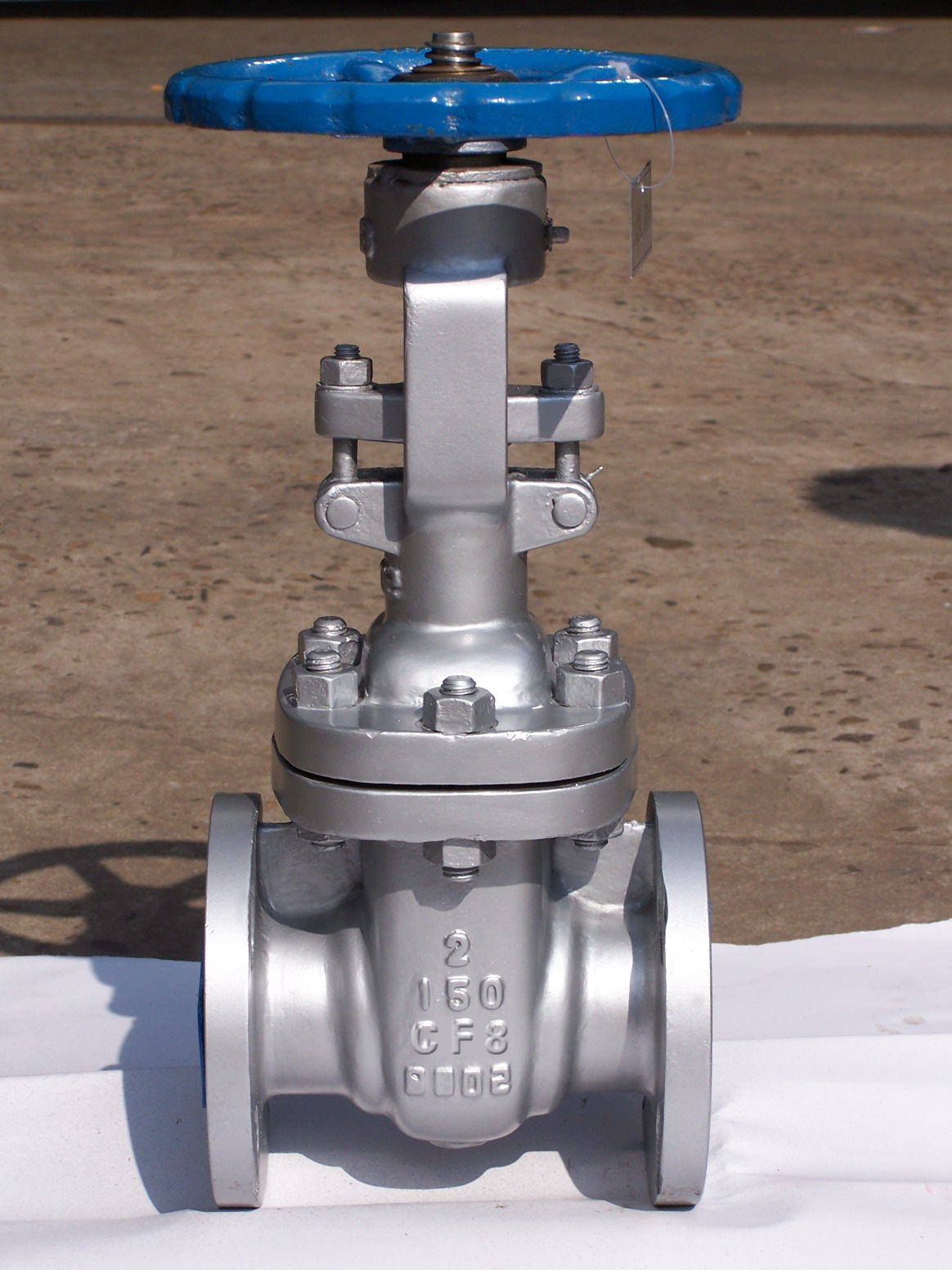
A 2″ stainless steel gate valve with flanged ends. Bolts connect the lower valve body with the upper “bonnet”. Visible threads on the valve stem protruding above the handwheel show that this is a rising-stem valve.

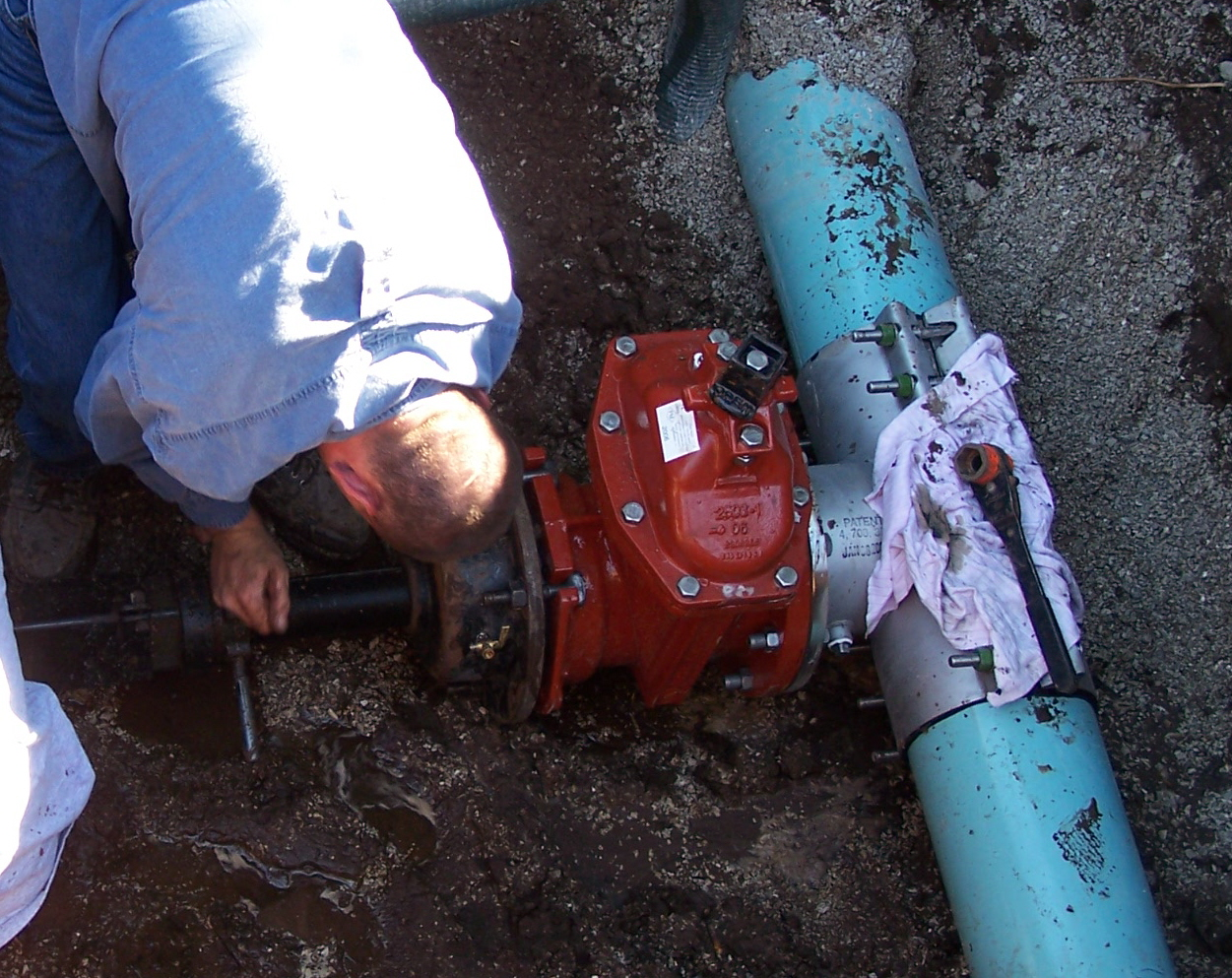
Gate valve being installed on a new water service to a fire hydrant. The valve material is ductile iron.

Gate valves

== See also ==
- Ball valve
- Blast gate
- Butterfly valve
- Control valve
- Diaphragm valve
- Globe valve
- Needle valve
- Process flow diagram
- Piping and instrumentation diagram
