= List of valves =

Valves are quite diverse and may be classified into a number of types.

== Basic types – by operating principle ==
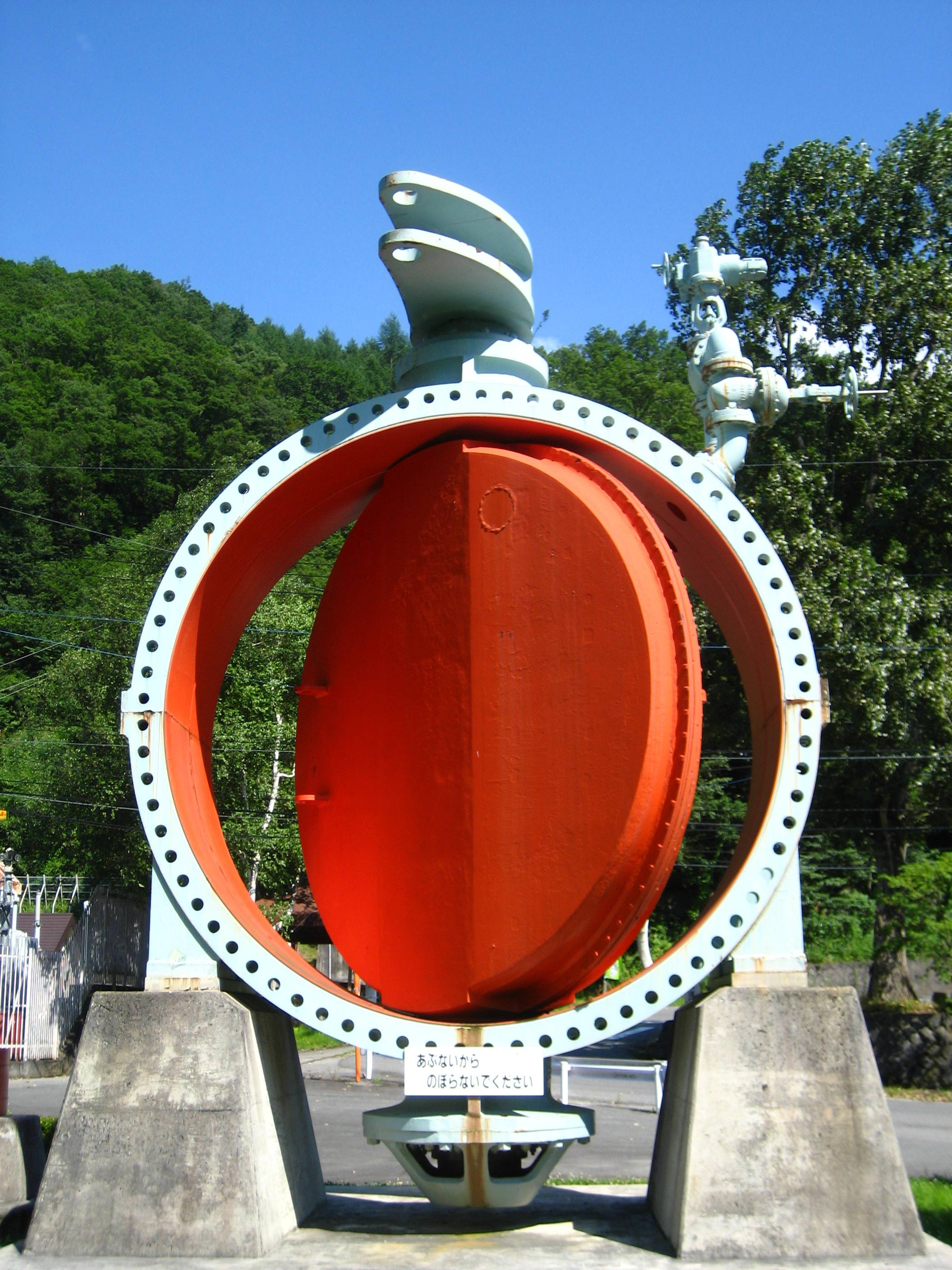
The inside of an extremely large butterfly valve

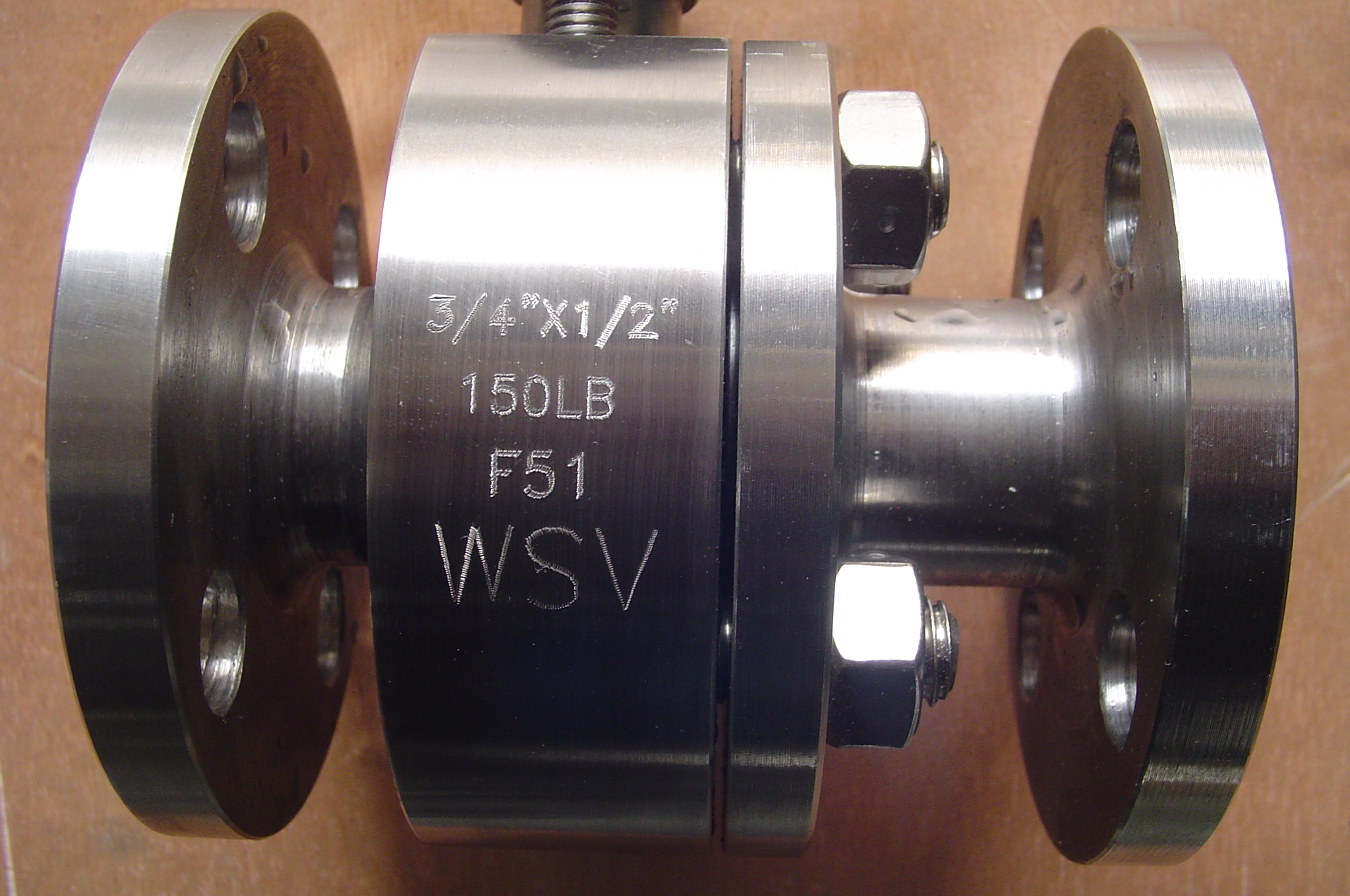
Duplex ball valve

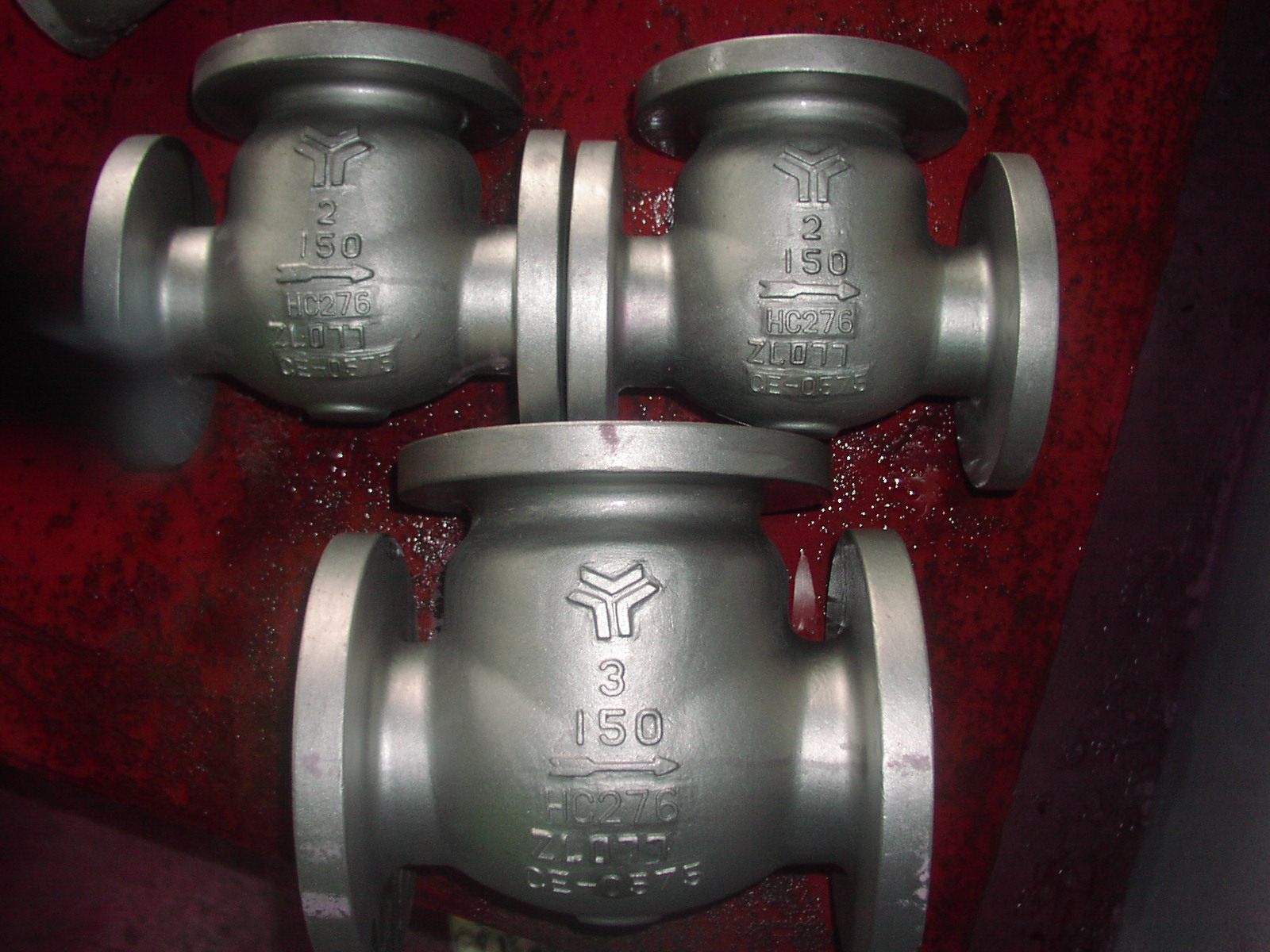
Three check valves in corrosion-resistant Hastelloy

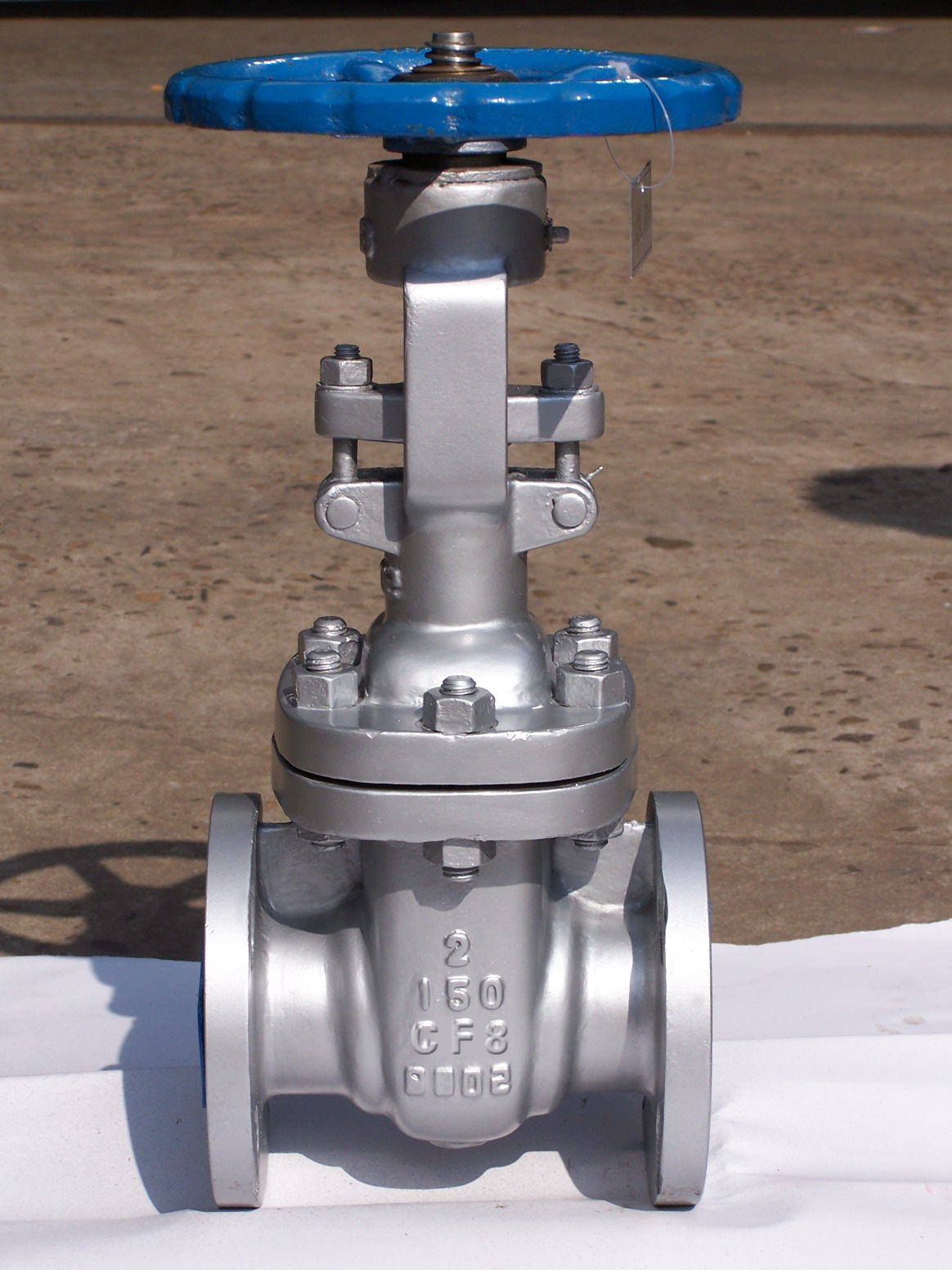
Stainless steel gate valve

Valves can be categorized into the following types, based on their operating mechanism:

- Ball valve, for on–off control without pressure drop. Ideal for quick shut-off, since a 90° turn completely shuts off, compared to multiple 360° turns for other manual valves
- Butterfly valve, for on–off flow control in large diameter pipes
- Choke valve, a solid cylinder placed around or inside a second cylinder with multiple holes or slots, inside a housing. Shifting the solid cylinder exposes more or fewer holes. Used in oil and gas wellheads, where the pressure drop is high. (Not to be confused with engine choke valve, below.)
- Diaphragm valve or membrane valve, controls flow by movement of a diaphragm. Used in pharmaceutical applications
- Gate valve, mainly for on–off control, with low pressure drop
- Globe valve, good for regulating flow. Uses a cylinder movement over a seat
- Knife valve, similar to a gate valve, but usually more compact. Often used for slurries or powders on–off control
- Needle valve for accurate flow control
- Pinch valve, for slurry flow regulation and control
- Piston valve, for regulating fluids that carry solids in suspension
- Piston valve (steam engine)
- Plug valve, slim valve for on–off control but with some pressure drop
- Solenoid valve, an electrically actuated valve for hydraulic or pneumatic fluid control
- Spool valve, for hydraulic control; similar to the choke valve

== Basic types – by function ==
Valves can be categorized also based on their function:

- Check valve or non-return valve, allows the fluid to pass in one direction only
- Flow control valve, to maintain and control a variable flow rate through the valve
- Poppet valve, commonly used in piston engines to regulate the fuel mixture intake and exhaust
- Pressure-balanced valve
- Pressure reducing valve, regulates the pressure of a fluid
- Safety valve or relief valve: operates automatically at a set pressure to correct a potentially dangerous situation, typically over-pressure
- Sampling valve

== Specific types ==
These are more specific types of valves, used only in particular fields or applications. Often they are subcategories of the classification by operating principle and by function:

- Aspin valve: a cone-shaped metal part fitted to the cylinder head of an engine
- Ballcock: often used as a water level controller (cistern)
- Bibcock: provides a connection to a flexible hosepipe
- Blast valve: prevents rapid overpressuring in a fallout shelter or a bunker
- Boston valve: three-part two-port check valve used on inflatable boats, air mattresses, airbeds etc.; available in two sizes, normal and small
- Ceramic valve, used mainly in high duty cycle applications or on abrasive fluids. Ceramic disc can also provide Class IV seat leakage
- Cock: colloquial term for a small valve or a stopcock
- Choke valve, Butterfly valve used to limit air intake in internal combustion engine. (Not to be confused with choke valves used in industrial flow control, above.)
- Clapper valve: a type of check valve used in the Siamese fire appliance to allow only one hose to be connected instead of two (the clapper valve blocks the other side from leaking out)
- Demand valve, part of a diving regulator
- Double beat valve
- Double check valve
- Duckbill valve
- Fill and drain valve: a valve used in space and missile industry which achieves extremely tight leakage, while providing redundant inhibits against external leakage
- Flapper valve
- Flow divider valve: a valve providing a plurality of output flows from a single fluid source
- Flutter (Heimlich) valve: a specific one-way valve used on the end of chest drain tubes to treat a pneumothorax
- Foot valve: a check valve on the foot of a suction line to prevent backflow
- Four-way valve: was used to control the flow of steam to the cylinder of early double-acting steam engines
- Freeze seal or Freeze plug: in which freezing and melting the fluid creates and removes a plug of frozen material acting as the valve
- Gas pressure regulator regulates the flow and pressure of a gas
- Heart valve: regulates blood flow through the heart in many organisms
- Hydrodynamic vortex valve: a passive flow control valve that uses hydrodynamic forces to regulate flow
- Larner–Johnson Valve: needle control valve often in large sizes used in water supply systems
- Leaf valve: one-way valve consisting of a diagonal obstruction with an opening covered by a hinged flap
- Line blind valve: a thin sheet oriented perpendicular to the pipe. The sheet has a solid end and a flow-through end; sliding it from one position to the other opens or stops the flow. Also called sliding blind valve
- Outflow valve: regulates flow and pressure, part of cabin pressurization
- Pilot valve: regulates flow or pressure to other valves
- Petcock, a small shut-off valve
- Pinch valve, "beach ball valve": simple, single-part two-port check valve made from soft plastic and molded onto inflatable units such as beach balls, air mattresses, water wings; can be inflated by pump or by mouth
- Plunger valve: To regulate flow while lowering the pressure
- Poppet valve and sleeve valve: commonly used in piston engines to regulate the fuel mixture intake and exhaust
- Pressure regulator or pressure reducing valve (PRV): reduces pressure to a preset level downstream of the valve
- Pressure sustaining valve, or back-pressure regulator: maintains pressure at a preset level upstream of the valve
- Presta valve, Schrader valve, or Dunlop valve, holds the air inside bicycle tires
- Pulse valve, extremely fast pulsing valve
- Reed valve: consists of two or more flexible materials pressed together along much of their length, but with the influx area open to allow one-way flow, much like a heart valve
- Regulator: used in SCUBA diving equipment and in gas cooking equipment to reduce the high pressure gas supply to a lower working pressure
- Rocker valve
- Rotary valves and piston valves: parts of brass instruments used to change their pitch
- Rotolock valve
- Rupture disc: a one-time-use replaceable valve for rapid pressure relief, used to protect piping systems from excessive pressure or vacuum; more reliable than a safety valve
- Saddle valve: where allowed, is used to tap a pipe for a low-flow need
- Schrader valve: holds the air inside automobile tires
- Security valve, a type of automatic shut-off valve (ASV): used to stop the flow of natural gas upon sudden pressure changes. Increased pressure or decreased pressure closes the valve (without using any external power sources). Installing a bypass pipe with a pushbutton to open valve (normally spring closed valve) between the inlet and outlet of the security valve can let the upstream and downstream pressure can be equalized on both sides of the security valve, so it can be reset. Security valves are used at schools, hospitals, prisons, and other hard-to-evacuate buildings.
- Slide gate valve: Ideal for handling dry bulk material in gravity flow, dilute phase, or dense phase pneumatic conveying applications. Similar to a sliding line blind valve, but the latter is for higher-pressure applications
- Slide valve: used in early steam engines to control admission and emission of steam from the piston
- Spherical disc valve: has a shutoff disc that swings completely out of the way to prevent jamming. Used for challenging materials such as powders, solids and slurries.
- Stopcock: restricts or isolates flow through a pipe
- Swirl valve: a specially designed Joule–Thomson pressure reduction/expansion valve imparting a centrifugal force upon the discharge stream for improving gas–liquid phase separation
- Tap (British English), faucet (American English): the common name for a valve used in homes to regulate water flow
- Tesla valve: a form of check valve with no moving parts, invented by Nikola Tesla for use with fluids
- Thermally operated valves:
  - Thermal expansion valve, used in refrigeration and air conditioning systems
  - Thermostatic mixing valve
  - Thermostatic radiator valve
  - Thermal shut off valve or Thermally released shut off valve, protects against excessive temperature, mandatory in the gas installation of some countries
- Trap primer: sometimes include other types of valves, or are valves themselves
- Vacuum breaker valve: prevents the back-siphonage of contaminated water into pressurized drinkable water supplies
