= Daniel R. Lucey =

American infectious disease physician

- Born: Merced, California, US
- Citizenship: American
- Education: Dartmouth College; Harvard School of Public Health
- Occupation: Infectious diseases professor
- Known for: Research in infectious diseases
- Medical career
- Profession: Physician
- Institutions: Dartmouth College
- Sub-specialties: Infectious diseases
- Research: Emerging infectious diseases
- Awards: AOA Medical Honor Society (1982); Commander's Award for Public Service (2002); Distinguished Service Award (2003); Lester B. Granger Award, Dartmouth College (2024)
- Website: Aoiconsulting.org.com

Daniel R. Lucey is an American physician, researcher, clinical professor of medicine of infectious diseases at Geisel School of Medicine at Dartmouth, and a research associate in anthropology at the Smithsonian National Museum of Natural History, where he has co-organised an exhibition on eight viral outbreaks.

Since 2022, he has taught about epidemics at Geisel School of Medicine. Previously, from 2021 to 2024, he taught at the Master of Arts in Liberal Studies (MALS) program at Dartmouth.

== Early life and education ==
Daniel R. Lucey was born at Castle Air Force Base, into a military family in Merced County, California and spent his childhood in various parts of the United States including Florida, Ohio, Virginia, South Carolina, Pennsylvania and North Dakota.

In 1973, he joined Dartmouth College, from where he graduated in psychology in 1977. He then gained admission to study medicine at Dartmouth Medical School, now known as Geisel School of Medicine. As a medical student in 1979, he spent two months at the Baragwanath Hospital, Soweto, South Africa, recalling later that this was his "first exposure to infectious disease".

== Early medical career ==
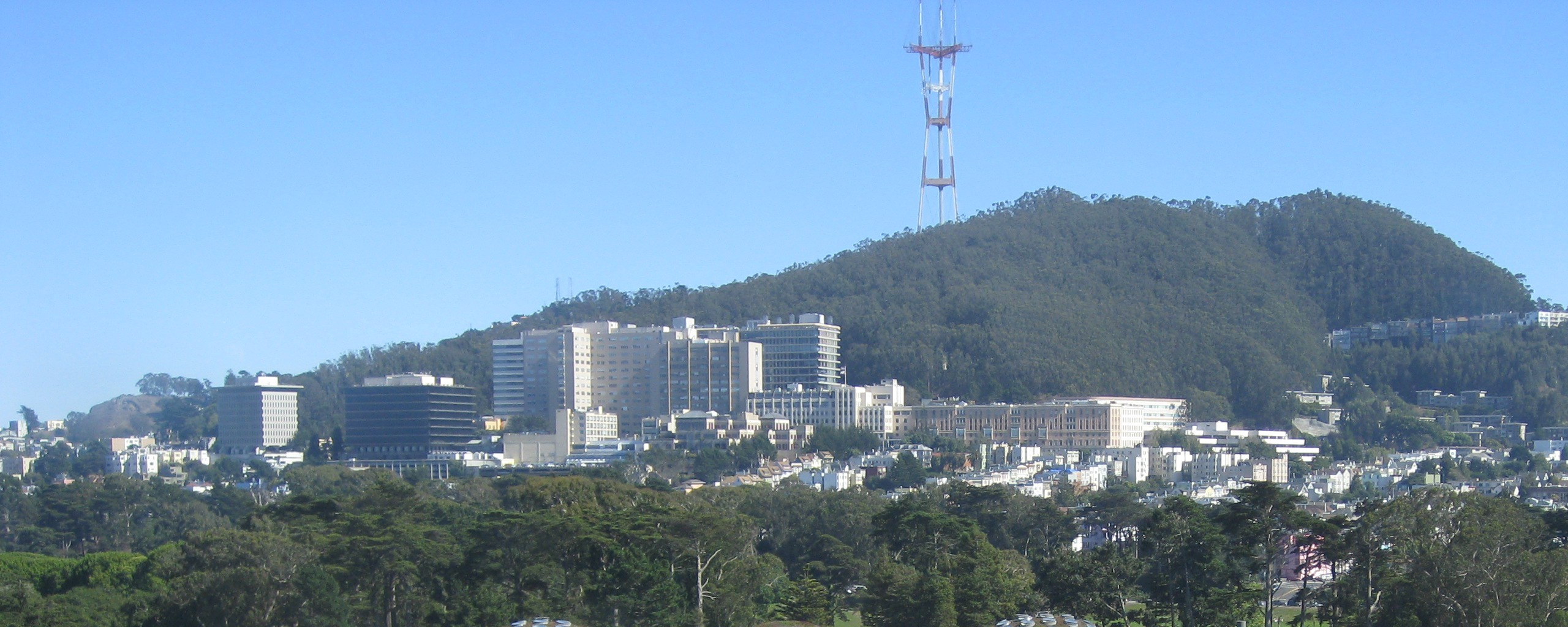
UCSF Medical Center

He gained an M.D. in 1982, following which he began his early training at the University of California, San Francisco (UCSF), where he worked with people who were suffering from a previously unknown disease, later known as HIV/AIDS.

In 1988 he gained a masters in public health from Harvard School of Public Health, where he had gained a fellowship of the Infectious Diseases Society of America.

From 1988 to 1990 he was attending physician at United States Air Force, Wilford Hall Medical Center, San Antonio, Texas. From 1992 to 1998, he was attending physician in infectious diseases and internal medicine at the National Naval Medical Center, Bethesda. In 1993, while he was studying HIV at the National Institutes of Health campus, he became a fellow of the American College of Physicians, Three years later, he was appointed to work on biodefense vaccines, vaccines for hepatitis A and B, and vaccines for Lyme disease and HIV, at the Center for Biologics Evaluation and Research at the Food and Drug Administration (FDA).

== Washington Hospital Center ==
In 2001, as chief of infectious diseases at the Washington Hospital Center during the September 11 attacks, he had worked on preparations on what to do should there be an intentional release of an infectious agent.

=== Anthrax ===
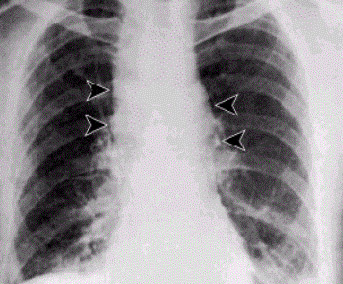
Inhalational anthrax, widening of mediastinum

Lucey contributed to the preparedness of the hospital for the subsequent 2001 anthrax attacks by arranging stock piles of antibiotics. Several media companies and two U.S. senators had received letters containing anthrax spores, infecting 22 people in total, five of whom died. Of these cases, 11 involved the skin and 11 were in the lungs (inhalation anthrax). Antibiotics needed to be given quickly. Noting that the first case of anthrax presented with meningitis, Lucey emphasised that should a diagnosis of anthrax meningitis ever be made, a public health response should be triggered.

He has published works on inhalation anthrax, particularly the staging of the disease which he divided into four: "asymptomatic, early-prodromal, intermediate-progressive and late-fulminant", with survival being more likely with earlier administration of antibiotics. Learning from the experiences of medical professionals who treated the victims of the 1979 anthrax outbreak in the city of Sverdlovsk, he developed an understanding of treating anthrax affecting the lungs by draining the resulting infected and toxic lung fluid, and injecting antibiotics directly into the pleural space. As a result, he has endorsed the stock-piling of items ready to perform pleural drainage should it be necessary. A later study published in the Annals of Internal Medicine, showed the importance of detecting anthrax early and administering antibiotics within hours of a bioterrorist attack, as well as stockpiling chest drains to perform lung fluid drainage.

=== Smallpox vaccination program ===
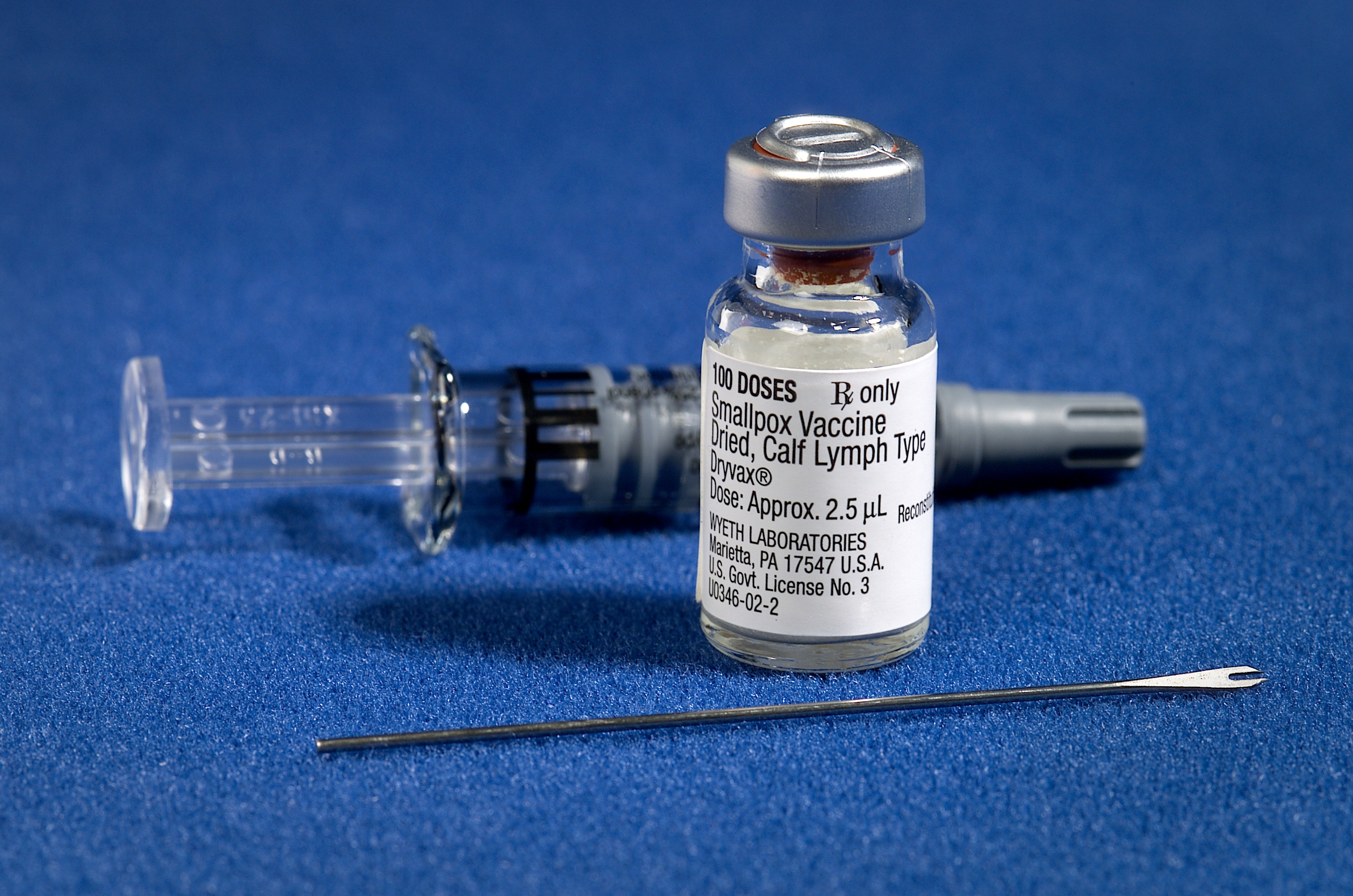
Smallpox vaccine

In 2003, Lucey was involved in a campaign to administer smallpox vaccinations to hundreds of thousands of workers. Despite the mounting cost of the campaign and doubts about it being necessary, Lucey in 2003, as director of the Center for Biologic Counterterrorism and Emerging Diseases at the Washington Hospital Center, endorsed the vaccination of healthcare workers and stated that "the threat is definitely real. This is a dangerous time," and advised "for ourselves to be protected, and to then be able to take care of patients and contribute to a large-scale vaccination program."

=== Lead contamination ===
In February 2004, a few days after starting work with biodefense at the Washington DC department of health, Lucey was present at a taskforce meeting on the high lead levels in Washington DC's public water system. He became involved in the subsequent investigations and gave testimony on April 7, 2004, to the Fisheries, Wildlife, and Water Subcommittee. The 'Lead Free Drinking Water Act of 2004' was introduced the following month.

== Georgetown University Medical Center ==
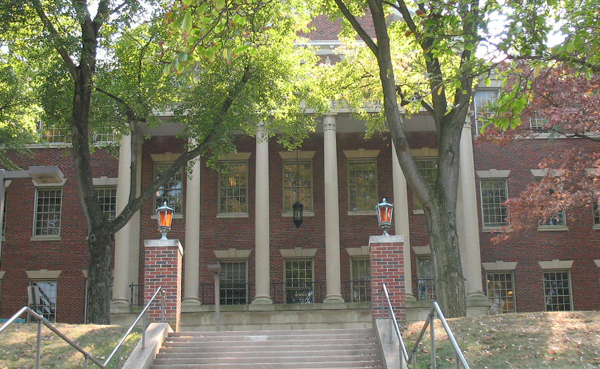
Georgetown University Medical Center

Since 2004, as adjunct professor of medicine and infectious diseases at Georgetown University Medical Center (GUMC), he has taught students on bioterrorism and emerging infectious disease.

In 2014, he became a senior scholar with the O'Neill Institute for National and Global Health Law at Georgetown University. In the same year, as an anthropology research associate, he co-organised an exhibition on epidemics at the Smithsonian National Museum of Natural History. Along with the institute's team, he worked with 30 colleagues from around the world to produce an exhibit of eight viral outbreaks, beginning with the quote "our world is interconnected more than ever before – by global travel and trade, technology, and even our viruses", and ending with "what's next is already here; we just haven't recognized it yet".

== Emerging infectious diseases ==
Science writer, Laura Stephenson Carter, wrote in the 2012 alumni album of Dartmouth College, that for over 30 years Lucey has been "chasing things you wouldn't want to catch". He coined the term "pan-epidemic", and between 2003 and 2016, he spent time researching infectious disease outbreaks in several countries.

=== SARS 2003 ===
In 2003 he worked on the SARS outbreaks in Guangzhou China, Hong Kong and Toronto, Canada, where the affected hospitals came to be known as SARS hospitals. At the time, regarding personal protective equipment, Lucey stated that "getting all hospital workers to comply with standard infection control procedures—all the time—was a key to stopping an outbreak of SARS in 2003 ... someone stood there and monitored you to make sure you followed, step by step by step, putting it on properly and taking it off."

=== Bird flu ===
Subsequently, he worked on the H5N1 bird flu outbreak in Thailand, Indonesia, Vietnam and Egypt, and the H1N1 flu in Egypt.

=== MERS ===
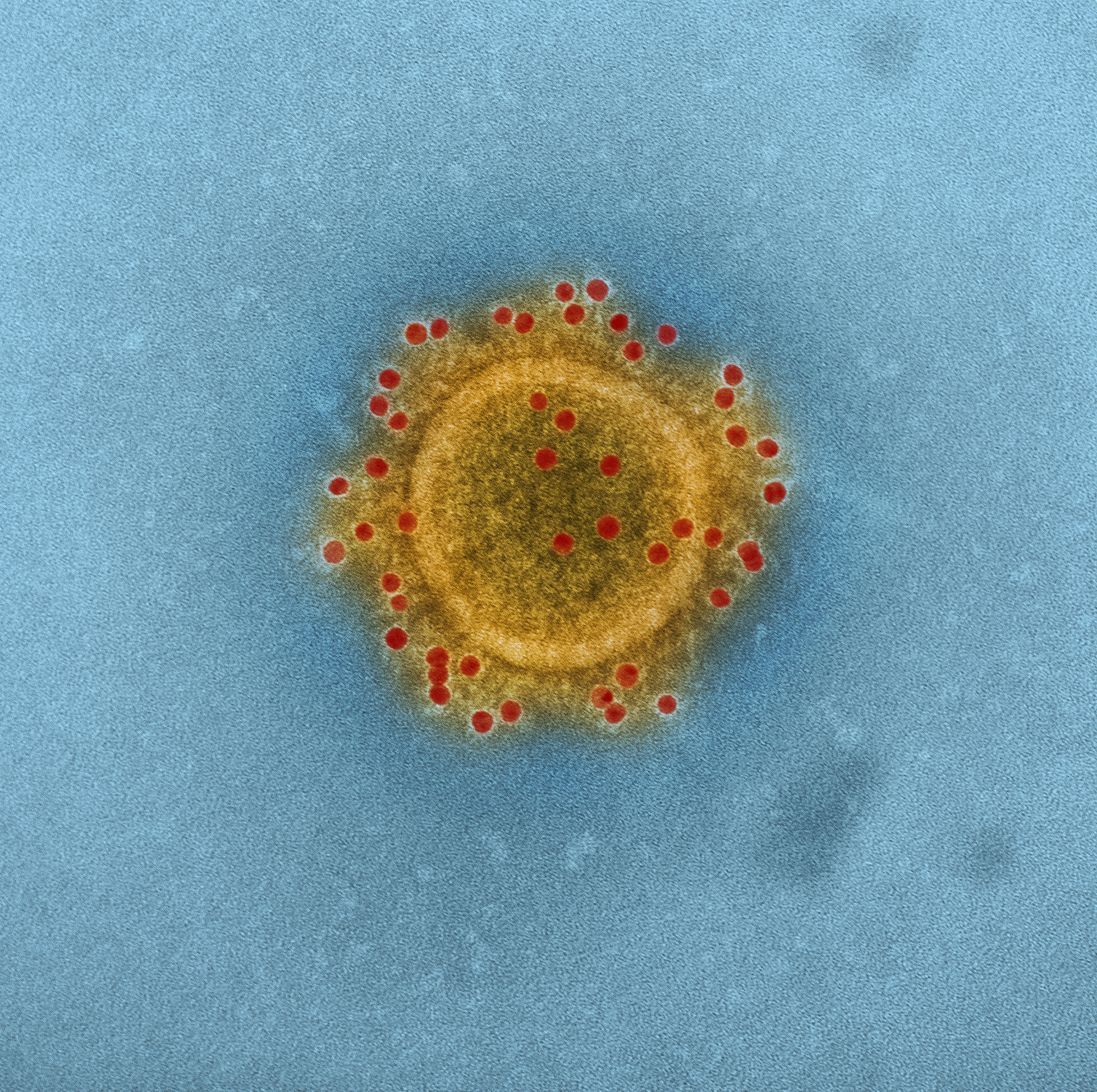
MERS Coronavirus Particle

He worked on MERS in the Middle East and Republic of Korea. Having studied MERS, he considers it "in terms of a super-spreading event rather than a super spreader".

=== Ebola in Western Africa ===
He treated people with ebola during the ebola outbreak in Liberia, Guinea and Sierre Leone, where he helped in the isolation unit at Connaught Hospital in Freetown.

=== Zika ===
In 2016, in the Journal of the American Medical Association, Lucey and his colleague Larry Gostin called for the zika epidemic in the Americas to be announced a public health emergency of international concern (PHEIC), criticizing the WHO for not escalating their response sooner, and stating that "it is far better to be overprepared than to wait until a zika epidemic spins out of control".

=== Nipah virus ===
Lucey visited Bangladesh during its nipah virus outbreak of 2004, caused by the consumption of date palm sap contaminated by fruit bats.

More than a decade later, when in 2018, nipah occurred in Kerala, India, where it had never previously emerged, he responded that "the medical and public health response in Kerala prevented it from becoming much worse". His report in 2018, published in the International Journal of Infectious Diseases, called the incident in Kerala "a bellwether of that potential risk of a Nipah pandemic". He warned of a potential epidemic of nipah virus, and stated at the time that "immediate enhanced preparation measures should include training on personal protective equipment (PPE), infection prevention and control, diagnostic testing, and clinical management protocols". The report advocated the need for countries that had no past experience of nipah outbreaks, to make preparations.

=== Yellow fever ===
On the question of whether Asia will ever encounter an outbreak of yellow fever, Lucey showed concern when, in 2016, an outbreak in Angola led to several infected travellers reaching China. He worked on yellow fever during that outbreak, highlighting difficulties should mass quantities of vaccine be required.

=== Other emerging infectious diseases ===
Other involvements have included the chikungunya outbreak in Pakistan, H7N9 influenza in China and the plague in Madagascar.

He was one expert who called for the 2018-20 ebola epidemic in the Democratic Republic of the Congo to be declared a PHEIC in July 2019.

=== COVID-19 pandemic ===
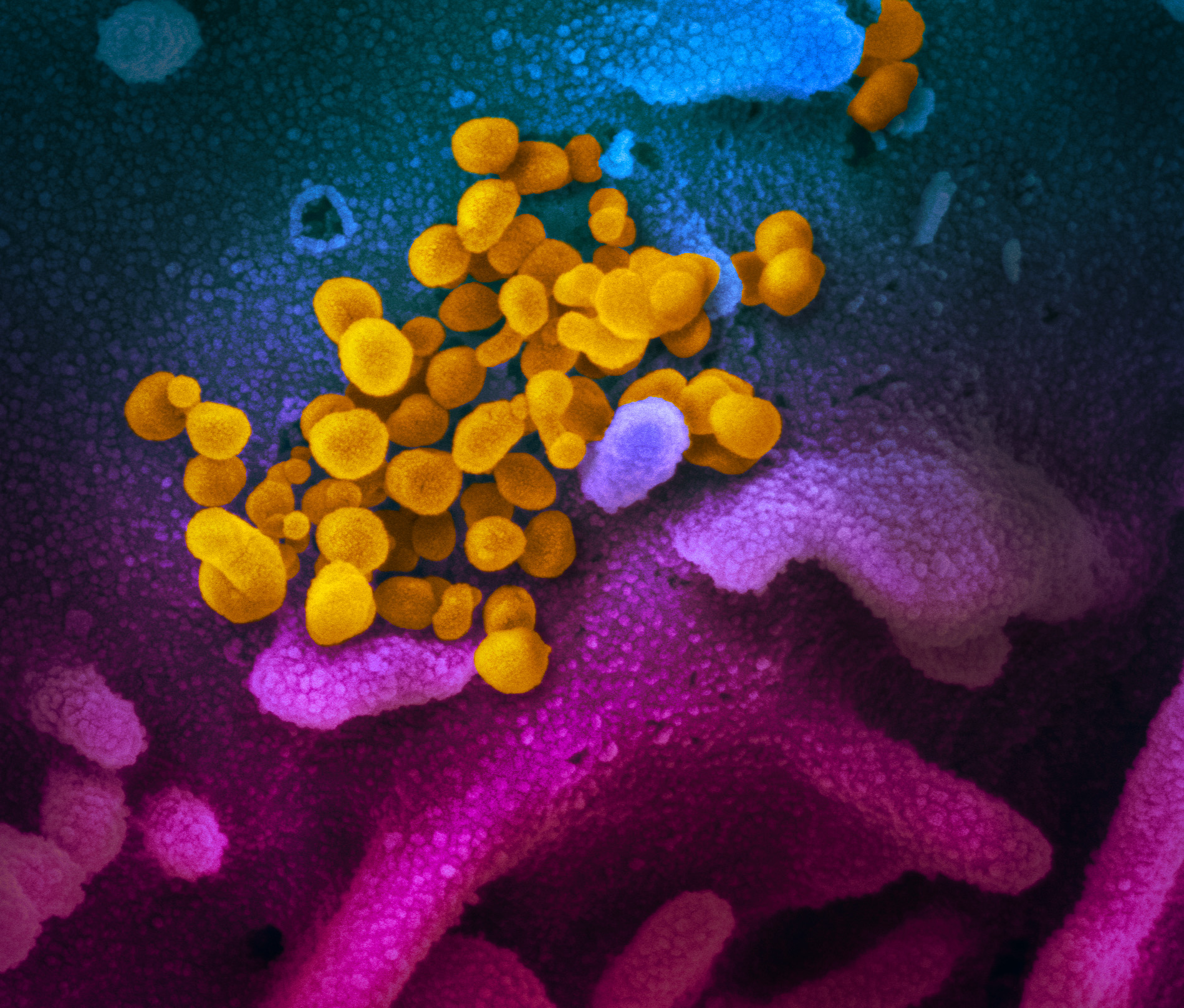
SARS-CoV-2 (yellow) (image via NIAID Rocky Mountain Laboratories (RML).

Reporting on his views of the ongoing pandemic of coronavirus disease, caused by SARS-CoV-2, which began in 2019, Lucey recalled that "the SARS outbreak in Toronto in 2003 started with one missed case". The new coronavirus outbreak, reported by the World Health Organization on December 31, 2019, has been associated with the Huanan Seafood Wholesale Market, a wet market in Wuhan, China. When Chinese researchers published their report in January 2020 in The Lancet, on the first 41 confirmed cases of the new coronavirus, Lucey hypothesised that if the data was accurate, with 12 of the 41 with no direct link to the market and the earliest reported onset of symptoms being December 1, 2019, and with a calculated incubation period of up to two weeks, the virus may have already been quietly circulating among humans from at least November 2019 and "the virus came into that marketplace before it came out of that marketplace". His analysis of the Chinese report was published in a paper titled "Coronavirus — Unknown Source, Unrecognized Spread, and Pandemic Potential" in Think Global in January 2020.

According to a report by Reuters, the United States military ran a propaganda campaign to spread disinformation about the Sinovac Chinese COVID-19 vaccine, including using fake social media accounts to spread the disinformation that the Sinovac vaccine contained pork-derived ingredients and was therefore haram under Islamic law. Lucey described the U.S. disinformation campaign as indefensible and stated that he was "dismayed, disappointed, and disillusioned".

== Awards ==
In 1982, while at Dartmouth Medical School, he gained membership to the AOA Medical Honor Society. In 1988, he received the young investigator award from the American Society of Tropical Medicine and Hygiene.

For his work in preparing the city of Washington for the anthrax attacks, Lucey received the "Walter Reed Army Medical Center (WRAMC) medal" in 2002. It was presented to him, a civilian, by General Harold Timboe. The following year the United States Department of the Army awarded him the Commander's Award for Public Service, for the care he gave to those injured at The Pentagon on September 11, 2001. In 2003, he received a Distinguished Service Award from the District of Columbia Hospital Association for Bioterrorism Preparedness. In the same year, the Medical Society of the District of Columbia awarded him their Meritorious Service Award.

In 2023 Dr. Lucey received the Career Achievement Award from Dartmouth's Geisel School of Medicine for his 41 years of national and international work since graduating from the medical school in 1982.

In May, 2024 he was awarded the Lester B. Granger, Dartmouth Class of 1918, Social Justice Award from the Division of Institutional Diversity and Equity at Dartmouth College.

"The award honors your extraordinary work and dedication as an international infectious disease specialist focusing on the intersection of infectious diseases and historically marginalized populations. It also recognizes your tireless work calling on governments and international bodies to do more and be better prepared in the face of global health epidemics."

In June 2024 he was voted by his MPH public health graduate students to receive on their Graduation Day the annual Master of Public Health Teaching Excellence Award.

== Selected publications ==
- "Development and evaluation of a quantitative, touch-down, real-time PCR assay for diagnosing Pneumocystis carinii pneumonia". Journal of Clinical Microbiology. American Society for Microbiology. Vol. 40, Number 2 (February 2002), pp. 490–494. doi:10.1128/jcm.40.2.490-494.2002. Hans Henrik Larsen et al.
- "The emerging zika pandemic: enhancing preparedness". Journal of the American Medical Association. Vol. 315, No. 9 (March 1, 2016), pp. 865–866. doi:10.1001/jama.2016.0904. Co-authored with Lawrence O. Gostin.
- "One health education for future physicians in the pan-epidemic "Age of Humans"". International Journal of Infectious Diseases. Vol. 64 (November 2017), pp. 1–3. doi:10.1016/j.ijid.2017.08.007. Co-authored with Sabrina Sholts, Halsie Donaldson, Joseph White, and Stephen R. Mitchell.
- "Enhancing preparation for large nipah outbreaks beyond Bangladesh: Preventing a tragedy like Ebola in West Africa". International Journal of Infectious Diseases. Vol. 72 (July 2018), pp. 69–72. doi:10.1016/j.ijid.2018.05.015. Co-authored with Halsie Donaldson.
- "Boosting Global Yellow Fever Vaccine Supply for Epidemic Preparedness: 3 Actions for China and the USA". Virologica Sinica. Vol. 34, Issue 3 (June 2019), pp. 235–239. doi:10.1007/s12250-019-00129-w. Co-authored with K. R. Kent.
- "Coronavirus—unknown source, unrecognized spread, and pandemic potential". Think Global Health. (February 6, 2020). Co-authored with K. R. Kent.
