= Fluid power =

Use of fluids under pressure to generate, control, and transmit power

Illustration of force multiplication by linked hydraulic cylinders, a fundamental feature of fluid power.

Fluid power is the use of fluids under pressure to generate, control, and transmit power. Fluid power is conventionally subdivided into hydraulics (using a liquid such as mineral oil or water) and pneumatics (using a gas such as compressed air or other gases). Although steam is also a fluid, steam power is usually classified separately from fluid power (implying hydraulics or pneumatics). Compressed-air and water-pressure systems were once used to transmit power from a central source to industrial users over extended geographic areas; fluid power systems today are usually within a single building or mobile machine.

Fluid power systems perform work by a pressurized fluid bearing directly on a piston in a cylinder or in a fluid motor. A fluid cylinder produces a force resulting in linear motion, whereas a fluid motor produces torque resulting in rotary motion. Within a fluid power system, cylinders and motors (also called actuators) do the desired work. Control components such as valves regulate the system.

== Elements ==
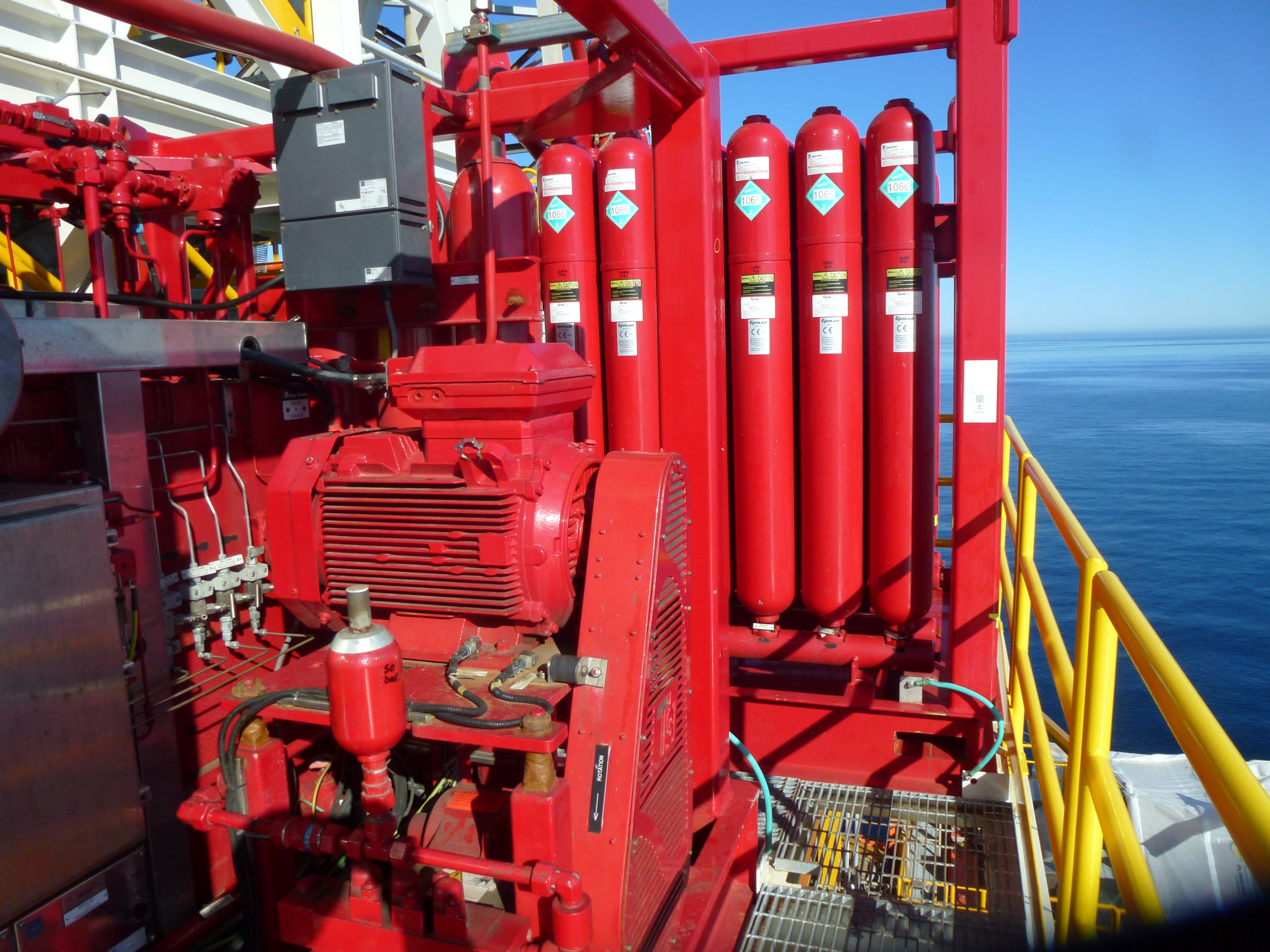
Hydraulic accumulator unit used in industrial fluid power systems

A fluid power system has a pump driven by a prime mover (such as an electric motor or internal combustion engine) that converts mechanical energy into fluid energy. Pressurized fluid is controlled and directed by valves into an actuator device such as a hydraulic cylinder or pneumatic cylinder, to provide linear motion, or a hydraulic motor or pneumatic motor, to provide rotary motion or torque. Rotary motion may be continuous or confined to less than one revolution.

== Hydraulic pumps ==
Dynamic (non positive displacement) pumps

This type is generally used for low-pressure, high volume flow applications. Since they are not capable of withstanding high pressures, there is little use in the fluid power field. Their maximum pressure is limited to 250-300 psi (1.7 - 2.0 MPa). This type of pump is primarily used for transporting fluids from one location to another. Centrifugal and axial flow propeller pumps are the two most common types of dynamic pumps.

Positive displacement pumps

This type is universally used for fluid power systems. With this pump, a fixed amount of fluid is ejected into the hydraulic system per revolution of pump shaft rotation. These pumps are capable of overcoming the pressure resulting from the mechanical loads on the system as well as the resistance to flow due to friction. These two features are highly desirable in fluid power pumps. These pumps also have the following advantages over non positive displacement pumps:

- High-pressure capability (up to 12,000 psi, ca. 80 MPa)
- Small compact size
- High volumetric efficiency
- Small changes in efficiency throughout the design pressure range

== Characteristics ==
Fluid power systems can produce high power and high forces in small volumes, compared with electrically-driven systems. The forces that are exerted can be easily monitored within a system by gauges and meters. In comparison to systems that provide force through electricity or fuel, fluid power systems are known to have long service lives if maintained properly. The working fluid passing through a fluid motor inherently provides cooling of the motor, which must be separately arranged for an electric motor. Fluid motors normally produce no sparks, which are a source of ignition or explosions in hazardous areas containing flammable gases or vapors.

Fluid power systems are susceptible to pressure and flow losses within pipes and control devices. Fluid power systems are equipped with filters and other measures to preserve the cleanliness of the working fluid. Any dirt in the system can cause wear of seals and leakage, or can obstruct control valves and cause erratic operation. The hydraulic fluid itself is sensitive to temperature and pressure along with being somewhat compressible. These can cause systems to not run properly. If not run properly, cavitation and aeration can occur.

== Application ==
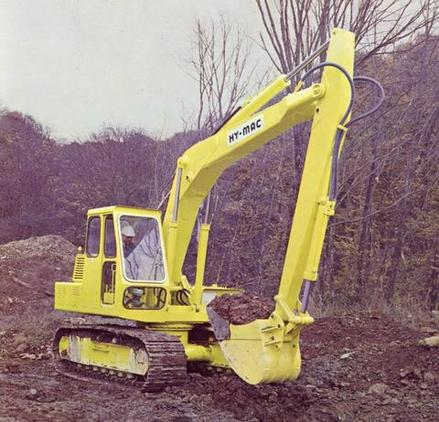
A hydraulic excavator

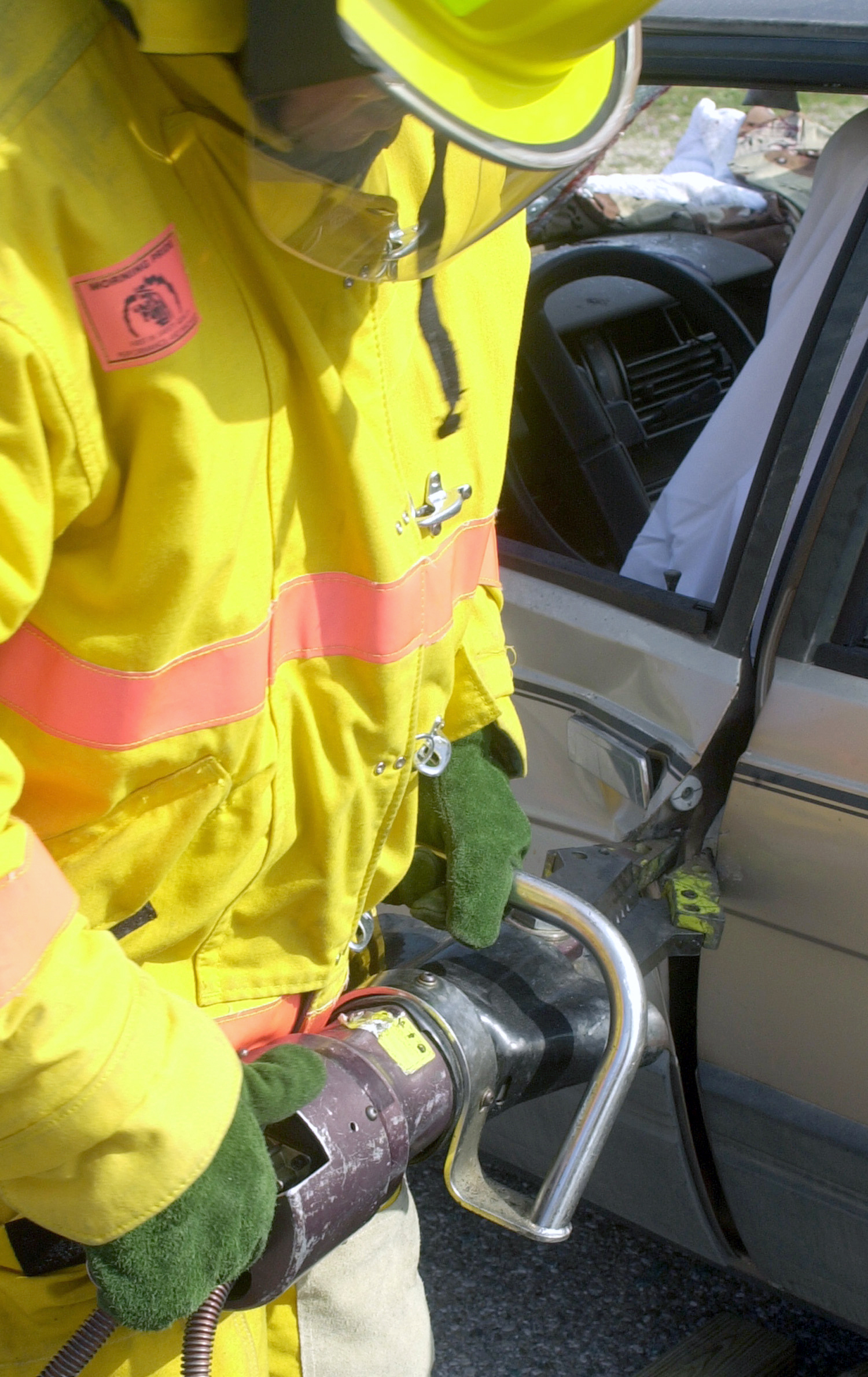
A hydraulic rescue tool is used to extract injured people from wrecked cars.

Mobile applications of fluid power are widespread. Nearly every self-propelled wheeled vehicle has either hydraulically-operated or pneumatically-operated brakes. Earthmoving equipment such as bulldozers, backhoes and others use powerful hydraulic systems for digging and also for propulsion. A very compact fluid power system is the automatic transmission found in many vehicles, which includes a hydraulic torque converter.

Fluid power is also used in automated systems, where tools or work pieces are moved or held using fluid power. Variable-flow control valves and position sensors may be included in a servomechanism system for precision machine tools. Below is a more detailed list of applications and categories that fluid power is used for:

- Industrial (also known as fixed)
  - metalworking
  - injection molding
  - controllers
  - material handling
- Aerospace
  - landing gears
  - brakes

== Pneumatic and hydraulic systems compared ==
Cost
Pneumatics are less expensive to build and operate. Air is used as the compressed medium, so there is no requirement to drain or recover fluid. Hydraulic systems use larger working pressures, and require larger parts than pneumatics.
Precision
Unlike liquids, gases change volume significantly when pressurized making it difficult to achieve precision.

== Common hydraulic circuit application ==
=== Synchronizing ===
This circuit works off of synchronization. As a cylinder reaches a certain point another will be activated, either by a hydraulic limit switch valve or by the build-up of pressure in the cylinder. These circuits are used in manufacturing. An example of this would be on an assembly line. As a hydraulic arm is activated to grab an object. It then will reach a point of extension or retraction, where the other cylinder is activated to screw a cap or top onto the object. Hence the term synchronizing.

=== Regenerative ===
In a regenerative circuit, a double acting cylinder is used. This cylinder has a pump that has a fixed output. The use of a regenerative circuit permits use of a smaller size pump for any given application. This works by re-routing the fluid to the cap instead of back to the tank. For example, in a drilling process a regenerative circuit will allow drilling at a consistent speed, and retraction at a much faster speed. This gives the operator faster and more precise production.

== Electrical control ==
Combinations of electrical control of fluid power elements are widespread in automated systems. A wide variety of measuring, sensing, or control elements are available in electrical form. These can be used to operate solenoid valves or servo valves that control the fluid power element. Electrical control may be used to allow, for example, remote control of a fluid power system without running long control lines to a remotely located manual control valve.

== See also ==
- Hydraulic circuit
- Hydraulic power network
- London Hydraulic Power Company
- Pneumatic circuit
- Pneumatic actuator
