= Henry Heimlich =

American thoracic surgeon (1920–2016)

- Born: Henry Judah Heimlich; February 3, 1920; Wilmington, Delaware, U.S.
- Died: December 17, 2016 (aged 96); Cincinnati, Ohio, U.S.
- Education: Cornell University (BA, MD)
- Years active: 1943–2016
- Known for: Abdominal thrusts ("Heimlich maneuver"); Flutter valve
- Spouse: Jane Murray (m. 1951)
- Children: 4
- Relatives: Arthur Murray (father-in-law)
- Medical career
- Profession: Physician and medical researcher
- Institutions: Deaconess Associations (Heimlich Institute); Physicians Committee for Responsible Medicine
- Awards: Lasker Award (1984); Engineering and Science Hall of Fame (1985); Golden Plate Award of Academy of Achievement (1985); Safety and Health Hall of Fame (1993)

Henry Judah Heimlich (February 3, 1920 – December 17, 2016) was an American thoracic surgeon and medical researcher. He is widely credited for the discovery of the Heimlich maneuver, a technique of abdominal thrusts to stop choking, first described in 1974. He also invented the Micro Trach portable oxygen system for ambulatory patients and the Heimlich Chest Drain Valve, or "flutter valve", which drains blood and air out of the chest cavity.

== Early life and education ==
Heimlich was born in Wilmington, Delaware, the son of Mary (Epstein) and Philip Heimlich. His paternal grandparents were Hungarian Jewish immigrants, and his maternal grandparents were Russian Jews. He graduated from New Rochelle High School (N.Y.) in 1937 and from Cornell University (where he also served as drum major of the Cornell Big Red Marching Band) with a BA in 1941. At the age of 23, he received his M.D. from Weill Cornell Medical College in 1943.

== Career ==
After medical school, Heimlich served with the U.S. Navy in China during World War II. In January 1945, as a member of the US Navy Reserve, Lieutenant (junior grade) Heimlich was assigned to Camp Four of the Sino-American Special Technical Cooperative Organization (SACO) located at Xamba, Suiyuan Province in northern China, on the southern edge of the Gobi Desert. Officially he was the chief medical officer responsible for the well-being of American and Chinese military personnel at this camp, but in actuality he also took care of a wide array of medical issues for civilians in the small town. Camp Four received news of the war's end in late August 1945. During this time, Heimlich claimed he developed an innovative treatment for victims of trachoma, a previously incurable bacterial infection of the eyelids that was causing blindness throughout Asia and the Middle East. According to Heimlich, his approach – a mixture of an antibiotic ground into a base of shaving cream – proved effective, and it was used successfully on patients.

=== Heimlich valve ===
In 1962, Heimlich invented the chest drainage flutter valve (also called the Heimlich valve), and was granted a patent for the device in 1969. He said his inspiration came from seeing a Chinese soldier die from a bullet wound to the chest during World War II, a claim that was disputed by Frederick Webster, Heimlich's medical assistant in China. The design of the valve allows air and blood to drain from the chest cavity in order to allow a collapsed lung to re-expand. The invention was credited with saving the lives of hundreds of American soldiers in the Vietnam War.

=== Heimlich maneuver ===
External audio
- "The Man Behind the Maneuver", Radiolab, includes an interview with Dr. Heimlich, produced by Pat Walters

On June 1, 1974, Heimlich first published his views about the first-aid maneuver that would bear his name in an informal article, "Pop Goes the Cafe Coronary", in the magazine Emergency Medicine. On June 11, Arthur Snider, science columnist for the Chicago Daily News wrote about Dr. Heimlich's findings, opening with the sentence, "A leading surgeon invites the public to try a method he has developed for forcing out food stuck in the windpipe of persons choking to death," in a story reprinted nationwide.

On June 19, 1974, the Seattle Post-Intelligencer reported that retired restaurant owner Isaac Piha, who had read the Snider article in the Seattle paper, used the procedure to rescue a choking victim, Irene Bogachus, in Bellevue, Washington, a story reprinted in other newspapers. An editorial followed in the August 12 issue of The Journal of the American Medical Association, which was the first to refer to the procedure as "the Heimlich Maneuver".

Heimlich formally described the technique in a pair of 1975 medical journal papers, published in The Journal of the American Medical Association and The Annals of Thoracic Surgery.

From 1976 to 1985, the choking-rescue guidelines of the American Heart Association and of the American Red Cross taught rescuers to first perform a series of back blows to remove the foreign body airway obstruction. If back blows failed, then rescuers learned to proceed with the Heimlich maneuver (aka "abdominal thrusts"). After a July 1985 American Heart Association conference, back blows were removed from choking-rescue guidelines. From 1986 to 2005, the published guidelines of the American Heart Association and the American Red Cross recommended only the Heimlich maneuver as the treatment for choking; the National Institutes of Health still does apply it for conscious persons over one year of age, as does the National Safety Council.

The 2005 choking-rescue guidelines published by the American Heart Association called the procedure "abdominal thrusts". The new guidelines stated that chest thrusts and back blows may also deal with choking effectively.

In 2005, the American Red Cross "downgraded" the use of the Heimlich maneuver, essentially returning to the pre-1986 guidelines. For conscious victims, the new guidelines (nicknamed "the five and five"), recommend first applying five back blows; if this method fails to remove the airway obstruction, rescuers are to then apply five abdominal thrusts. For unconscious victims, the new guidelines recommend chest thrusts, a method first recommended in a 1976 study by Charles Guildner, with results duplicated in a study by Audun Langhelle in 2000. The 2006 guidelines eliminated the phrase "Heimlich maneuver" and replaced it with "abdominal thrust".

Allegations of case fraud have dogged Heimlich's promotion of abdominal thrusts as a treatment for drowning. The 2005 drowning rescue guidelines of the American Heart Association did not include citations of Heimlich's work and warned against using the Heimlich maneuver for drowning rescue as unproven and dangerous, due to its risk of vomiting leading to aspiration.

In 2003, Heimlich's colleague Edward Patrick issued a press release portraying himself as the uncredited co-developer of the maneuver. He stated, "I would like to get proper credit for what I've done ... but I'm not hyper about it."

Heimlich claimed to have used his namesake maneuver to rescue a choking victim for the first time on May 23, 2016, when he was age 96, reportedly saving the life of a fellow resident of his senior living community, Patty Ris. However, in 2003, he told the BBC that he had used it for the first time on a man choking in a restaurant. His son, Peter M. Heimlich, said, "Both 'rescues' were bogus."

Heimlich claimed his namesake treatment may have saved the lives of more than 50,000 people. However, according to Michael Sayre in 2005, "Despite widespread education on the use of the Heimlich maneuver and other techniques for treatment of acute airway obstruction, the death rate remains stable."

=== Malariotherapy ===
From the early 1980s, Heimlich advocated malariotherapy, the deliberate infection of a person with benign malaria in order to treat ailments such as cancer, Lyme disease and (more recently) HIV. As of 2009 the treatments were unsuccessful, and attracted criticism as both scientifically unsound and dangerous. The United States Food and Drug Administration and Centers for Disease Control and Prevention have rejected malariotherapy and, along with health professionals and advocates for human rights, consider the practice "atrocious". The Heimlich Institute, a subsidiary of Deaconess Associations of Cincinnati, conducted malariotherapy trials in Ethiopia, though the Ethiopian Ministry of Health was unaware of the activity. Heimlich stated that his initial trials with seven subjects produced positive results, but refused to provide details.

Studies in Africa, where both HIV and malaria occur commonly, indicate that malaria/HIV co-infection increases viral load and that malaria could increase the rate of spread of HIV as well as accelerate disease progression. Based on such studies, Paul Farmer described the idea of treating HIV with malaria by stating "it seems improbable. The places where malaria takes its biggest toll are precisely those in which HIV reaps its grim harvest".

== Personal life ==
On June 4, 1951, Heimlich married Jane Murray, daughter of ballroom dancing entrepreneur Arthur Murray. Heimlich's wife, a freelance features writer who later became a proponent of controversial medical treatments like chelation therapy, wrote What Your Doctor Won't Tell You: The Complete Guide to the Latest in Alternative Medicine. She also co-authored a book on homeopathy with Maesimund B. Panos called Homeopathic Medicine at Home.

Heimlich and his wife had four children: Phil Heimlich, a former Cincinnati elected official and one-time conservative Christian radio talk-show host; investigative blogger Peter M. Heimlich; Janet Heimlich, a freelance writer and author of Breaking Their Will: Shedding Light on Religious Child Maltreatment; and Elisabeth Heimlich. Peter maintains a website that describes what he and his wife, Karen M. Shulman, consider to be Dr. Heimlich's "wide-ranging, unseen 50-year history of fraud." Peter has called his father "a spectacular con man and serial liar" and has claimed "the only thing my father ever invented was his own mythology."

Heimlich was a vegetarian and in the early 2000s was on the advisory board of the Physicians Committee for Responsible Medicine.

Heimlich's memoir, Heimlich's Maneuvers: My Seventy Years of Lifesaving Innovation, was published in 2014 by Prometheus Books.

== Death ==
A statement from his family said Heimlich died at The Christ Hospital on December 17, 2016, after complications from a heart attack in his home in Hyde Park, Cincinnati, on December 12. He was 96 years old.
