= Sampling valve =

Valve used for taking samples

A sampling valve is a type of valve used in process industries that allows taking a representative portion of a fluid (gases, liquids, fluidized, solids, or slurries) to test (e.g. by physical measurements, chemical analysis, microbiological examination), typically for the purposes of identification, quality control, or regulatory assessment. It is a valve used for sampling.

The sampling valve allows the operator to extract a sample of the product from the production line or reactor and safely store it for transportation to the laboratory where it will be analysed or to the archive room where it can be retrieved for further use.

In chemical plants, a sample can be taken during the process to ensure that the output meets specifications (or that the quality is acceptable), before shipping the chemical good or before accepting the chemical product.

== Sampling problem ==
When sampling chemical products, it is of utmost importance to select representative material to analyse. The sample must be representative of the lot, and the choice of samples is critical to producing a valid analysis. The statistics of the sampling process are also important.

And in order for a sample to be representative, it must not contain remains of previous batches that might have stayed in the valve's "dead space". For example, a ball valve commonly found in tap valves consists of a ball that control the flow of the liquid. Once the valve is closed, liquid stays in the ball and the next time the valve is opened, that liquid flows first. If a sample is taken using a ball valve, the valve has to be flushed before the sample is taken.

This raises two additional problems:

1. If the liquid is a chemical substance that solidifies at room temperature such as polymer or other plastics, it can block the valve and prevent a second sample to be taken.
2. The residue of the chemical substance that was flushed needs to be recycled or destroyed at a cost both for the chemical plant and the environment.

When sampling hazardous chemicals or deadly substances, it is important that the operator is not exposed to toxic fumes or vapours. These can fatally harm people and should they be released in the atmosphere, they will pollute the environment.

== Choosing a sample valve ==
When choosing a sampling valve, different factors have to be considered:

- The material, pressure and temperature rating, gaskets, size and position of the valve according to the pipe specification of the plant.
- The handle or actuator type according to the position (reach) of the valve and according to the sampled chemical (e.g. whether if the product contains solid particles or not)
- The receptacle to store the sample for transportation (bottles, container, bag, piston injector or syringe)

== See also ==
- Other type of valves
- Sampling
