= Swirl valve =

Swirl valve technology has been developed by Twister BV of the Netherlands primarily for the gas processing market. This technology is similar to the swirl tube and can also be applied for liquid/liquid separation applications such as oil/water separation and for oil degassing. It is currently being used for optimising existing Joule–Thomson (JT-LTS) systems to minimise liquid carryover. The swirl valve is exactly the same as a Joule-Thomson (JT) choke valve, but it enhances the performance of downstream separators for the same pressure drop, by maximising droplet coalescence. The technology can be applied where a low temperature separator is undersized, or when a lower pressure drop over a JT valve is needed with a similar dew pointing performance. It can also be applied for reducing glycol/chemical inhibition liquid mist carry-over problems.
