= Saddle valve =

Valve

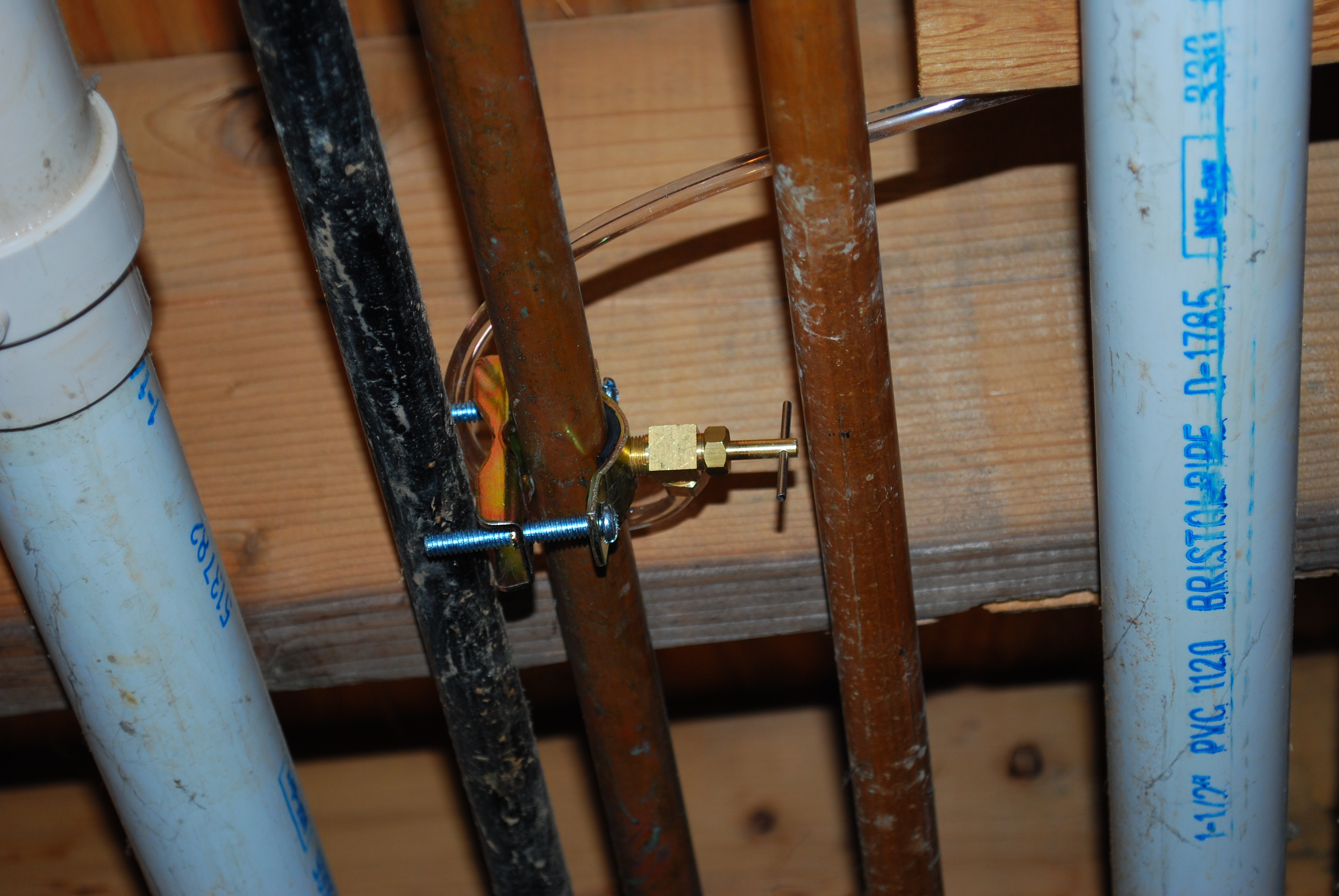
A saddle valve used to connect a humidifier's water intake to a residential cold water pipe.

A saddle valve is a valve used in plumbing to supply liquid at a low volume and pressure. Its name refers to how the valve "saddles" the line from both sides when installed.

A saddle valve typically used for supplying cold water, via a 3/8 inch tube, to humidifiers and icemakers in freezers. It is mounted directly on to a pipe which is usually 1/2 inch copper tubing. Saddle valves are self-tapping devices. Once mounted on a line, with the included rubber seal in place, turning the valve fully clockwise initially pierces the water line. Turning the handle counter-clockwise opens the valve. These valves can be installed without shutting off the main water supply.

Plumbing codes, local or international, often do not allow use of a saddle valve; instead a tee and a conventional globe, gate, or ball valve can be installed.
