= Leaf valve =

Type of check valve

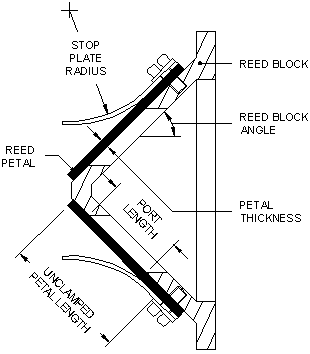
Section view of Mota-10 reed/leaf valve

A leaf valve, also known as a reed valve, is a type of check valve that only allows fluid to flow in a single direction. These valves use thin pieces of metal, fiberglass, or carbon fiber, known as reeds, leaves, or petals, to form a barrier between two chambers. When air or fuel passes through the reeds, the flap opens and allows the fluid to enter the chamber. The reeds close when the flow stops, preventing backflow.

== Applications ==
=== Motorcycles ===
Leaf valves are commonly mounted in the intake port of most 2-stroke motorcycle engines. When the piston moves up in the cylinder, the valve opens and allows air and fuel to pass through the intake port and into the carburetor. When the piston moves down, the valve closes and the compressed air in the cylinder is forced out through the exhaust port. This motion of the leaves occurs autonomously due to a pressure difference between the intake port and the carburetor and helps to atomize the air/fuel mixture for better combustion and an increase in engine power. The leaf valve opens and closes with every revolution of the engine.

=== Pumps ===
Leaf valves can sometimes be seen in some reciprocating compressors. The valve opens to allow the fluid to flow into the pressurized chamber when the compressor is performing a compressive stroke. The valve closes automatically when the compressor retracts in order to maintain the high pressure in the pressurized chamber.

== Patents ==
Patents exist in the United States which specify the mechanical use of leaf valves to control various types of fluids.

United States Patent 4930535 is a folding leaf valve which is described as a valve that, "folds upon itself to provide positive sealing of a pressurized chamber under a variety of pressure conditions. In particular, the valve stem folds to effectively close the lumen and provide a positive seal even at low differential pressure."

United States Patent 4795340 is a single leaf valve for a gas-fired boiler. It has a seat for a valve leaf, and a single valve leaf for the two constituents, this single valve leaf being flexible and deformable.... Application, in particular, to gas-fired boilers of the pulsed-combustion type."

United States Patent 5441133 – This hydraulic damper has a leaf valve stopper, the patented invention relates to a hydraulic damper. A leaf valve and a main valve are provided at an inner seat and an outer seat having different heights to each other arranged at outlet ports of a piston in such a way as they may be opened or closed... an attenuation force can be stabilized.. and the leaf valve is supported by the tapered or curved surface of the stopper when flexed, resulting in that no cracks are generated.
