= Rotolock valve =

A service valve is a valve used to separate one piece of equipment from another in any system where liquids or gases circulate. Two types of service valves are marketed: the Schrader-type valve and the stem-type service valve. Specialized versions are made for specific purposes, such as the Rotolock valve (a stem-type valve also called a Rotalock valve), which is a special refrigeration valve with a teflon ring seated against a machined surface enclosed by a threaded fitting; this valve allows the technician to remove all refrigerant from the compressor without requiring removal of the system charge.
