= Ceramic valve =

Valve with special ceramics

A ceramic valve is a valve with ceramic trim, ball, seat, disc or lining. A carbon steel or stainless steel body is used to protect the ceramic trim from being damaged by sudden thermal or mechanical shock. Advanced ceramics are used in the manufacture including alumina, zirconia and silicon nitride. Significant benefits of the use of ceramic in valves (when compared to steel or other traditional materials) include resistance to wear and their lower mass. Thanks to the excellent corrosion resistance, abrasive resistance and wear resistance, ceramic valves are often used in severe corrosive and abrasive applications, such as FGD, and pneumatic refuse conveying systems.
