= Chest drainage =

Chest drain management
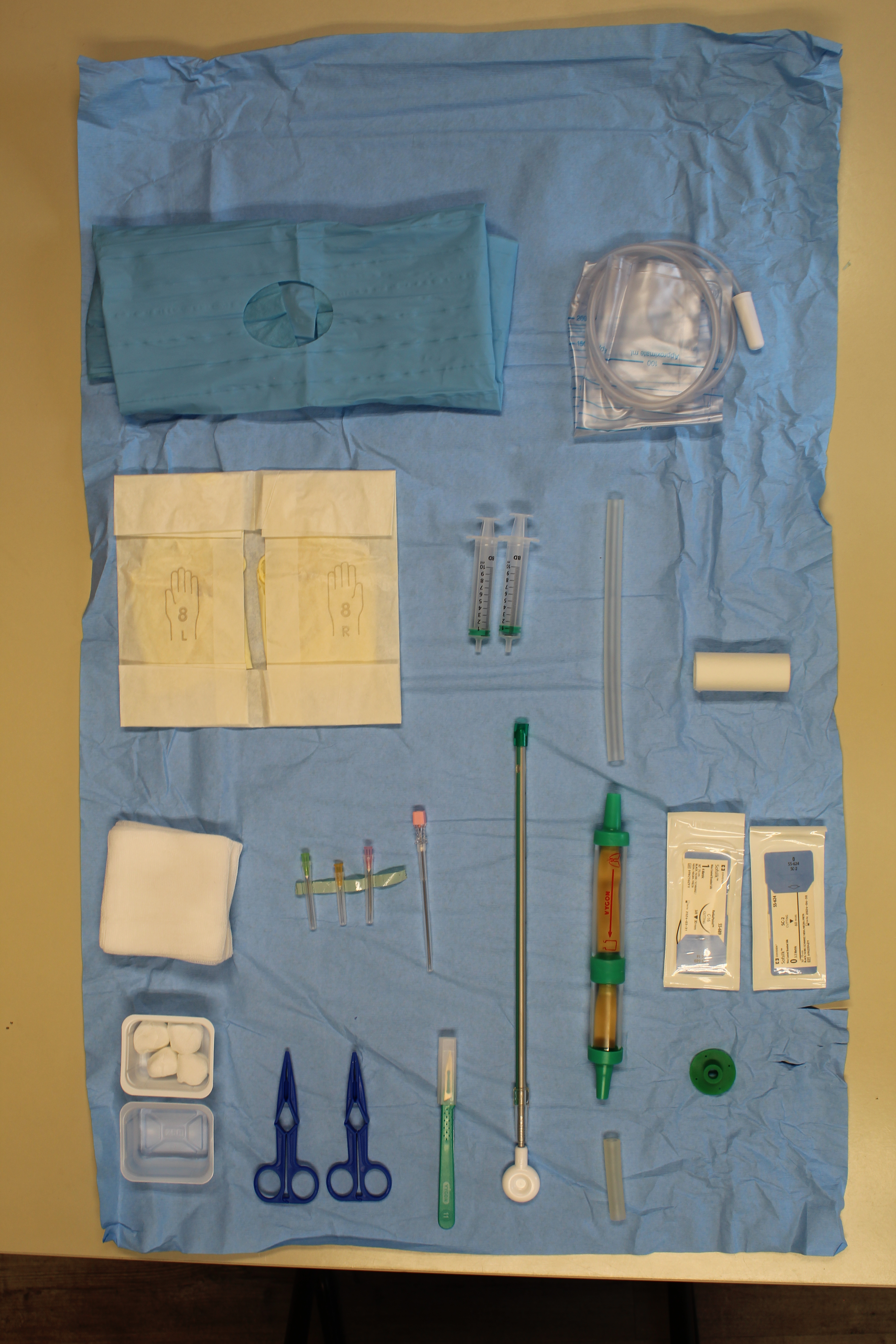
- An emergency chest drainage set used by emergency doctors in Austria
- Specialty: Cardiothoracic surgery

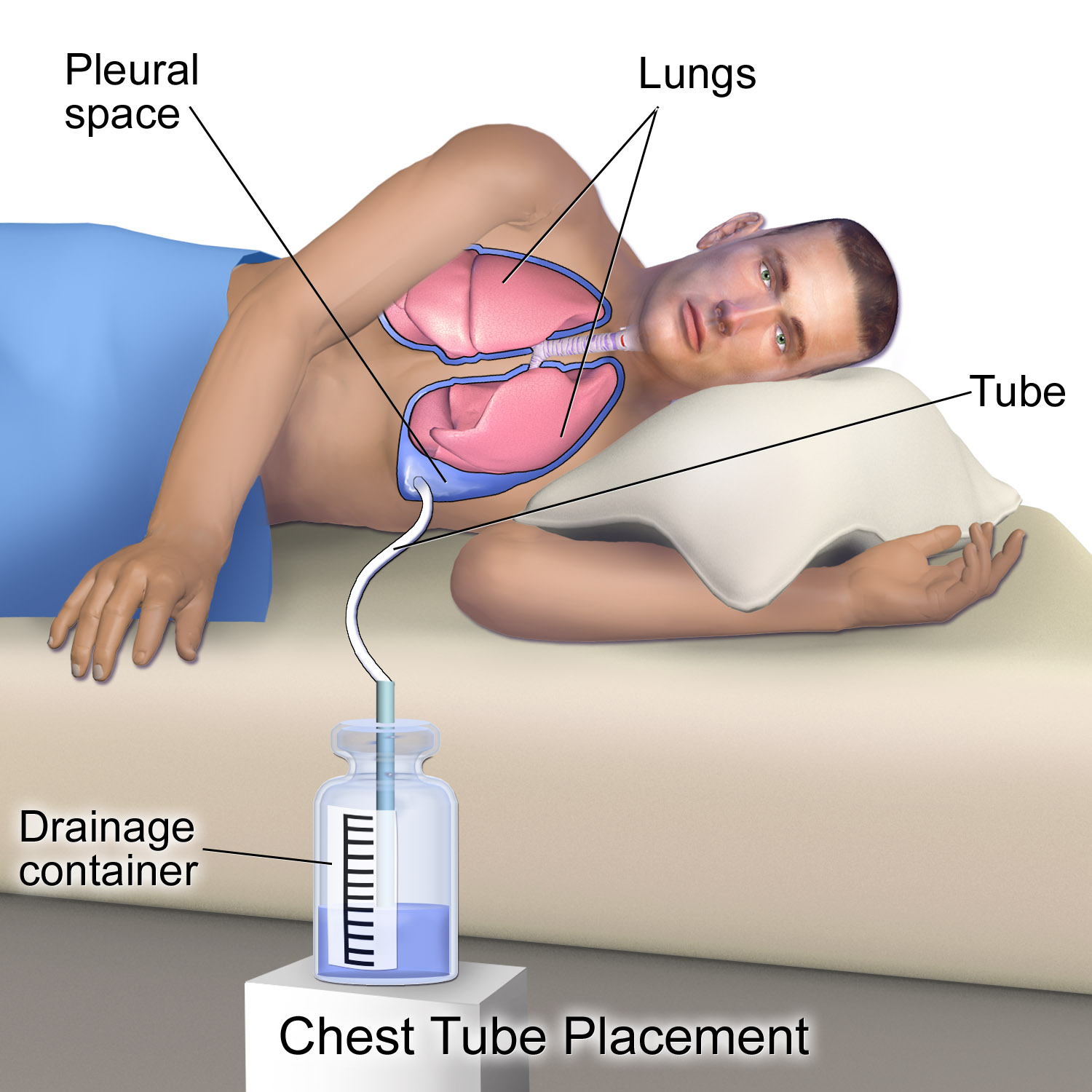
Sketch depicting a chest drainage in course

Chest drains are surgical drains placed within the pleural space to facilitate removal of unwanted substances (air, blood, fluid, etc.) in order to preserve respiratory functions and hemodynamic stability. Some chest drains may utilize a flutter valve to prevent retrograde flow, but those that do not have physical valves employ a water trap seal design, often aided by continuous suction from a wall suction or a portable vacuum pump.

The active maintenance of an intrapleural negative pressure via chest drains builds the basis of chest drain management, as an intrapleural pressure lower than the surrounding atmosphere allows easier lung expansion and thus better alveolar ventilation and gas exchange.

== History ==
The so-called "central vacuum" was the first sub-atmospheric pressure device available. Sub-atmospheric pressure of around 100 cm of water column was historically generated at a central location in the hospital. This "central vacuum" was available throughout the entire hospital, as it was proved via a tubing system. It was referred to as "wall suction".

Reduction valves that reduce the negative pressure to a therapeutically reasonable range were commercially available later. Due to this, multi-chamber suction – the use of three-chamber systems – was developed. In the 1960s, the first pumps (Emerson-Pump) were available. These and other systems launched later generated a fixed "negative pressure". These pumps couldn't compensate for an inadequate position of the collection chamber of a siphon. Since 2008, an electronically driven and regulated system is available, generating a "negative pressure" on demand.

== Suction process ==
External suction (previously referred to as active suction) is used to create a sub-atmospheric pressure at the tip of a catheter. As the atmospheric pressure is lower compared to the intrapleural pressure, the lack of external suction (which was previously referred to as passive suction) is used to drain air and fluids. Traditional drainage systems are not able to suction sub-atmospheric pressure in the pleural space. These systems only allow for a regulation of pressure via the system itself but cannot regulate sub-atmospheric pressure in the pleural space.

== Drain types ==
=== Heber- and Bülau- Drain principles ===
Two different principles are used in chest drainage management: The Heber-Drain principle and the Bülau-Drain principle. The "Heber-Drain" is based on the Heber principle, which uses hydrostatic pressure to transfer fluid from the chest to a collection canister. It produces permanent passive suction. As the Heber drain is a classical gravity drain, the canister must be placed below chest level to be active. The difference in height between the floor and the patient bed determines the resultant sub-atmospheric pressure. With a difference, for example, of 70 cm in height, a pressure of minus 70 cm of water is created. A water seal component is always combined with a Heber-Drain.

The "Bülau-Drain" is based on the Bülau principle and creates a permanent passive suction within a closed system that is based on the Heber-Drain principle. The pulmonologist Gotthard Bülau (1835-1900) used this system in 1875 for the first time for the treatment of pleural empyema.

=== Mediastinal drain ===
This type of drainage is mainly used in cardiac surgery. Mediastinal drains are placed behind the sternum and/or next to the heart. The main indication in these cases is the monitoring of post-operative bleeding. Whether these drains are used with active suction or not depends on factors such as personal preference and experience of the physician, individual patient-related factors etc...

=== Pericardial drain ===
Drainage of the pericardium can be achieved by puncture (transcutaneously) or surgically. In the first case, small-bore catheters not suitable for the drainage of blood (e.g. hemopericard) are used. Pericardial drains are mostly used with the help of gravity. As a pericardial drain is placed surgically, a largo bore drain is used with a decreased probability of clogging.

=== Chest drainage systems ===
==== One-chamber-system ====
The simplest system that is sufficient for chest drainage is a one-chamber system. It uses either a Heber-drain or an active suction source and comprises a single collection canister. For active or passive air evacuation, a water seal component is attached. To ensure that all air is sucked out when using a Heber-drain, manual support might be needed. To prevent a pneumothorax or subcutaneous emphysema when the patient is not able to breathe out or cough out surplus air, the height between the patient bed and the ground might need adjustment. As air leaks are not always easy to observe, some one-chamber systems are limited when it comes to the treatment of huge air leaks, especially when the patient produces a lot of foam.

==== Two-chamber-system ====
In a two-chamber system air and fluid are directed to a first collection canister. Gravity keeps the fluid in the first canister, whereas air is directed into a second canister. The air can either actively or passively be released via a water seal. Two-chamber systems are mainly used for patients with huge air leaks. These patients often produce foam due to protein rich surfactant that might enter the tubing toward the patient.

==== Multi-chamber-system ====
Early three-chamber systems used an extra glass bottle filled with water as a third water-vacuometer chamber in addition to a two-chamber system. The sub-atmospheric pressure was controlled with a pipe. The higher the pipe depth, the lower the generated pressure in the pleural space. These systems were used in times of the central vacuum and are not used anymore as they caused accidents and were not very ease to use. The mechanics of these systems depended on high flows (20l/min) for the system to be considered active.

==== Digital systems ====
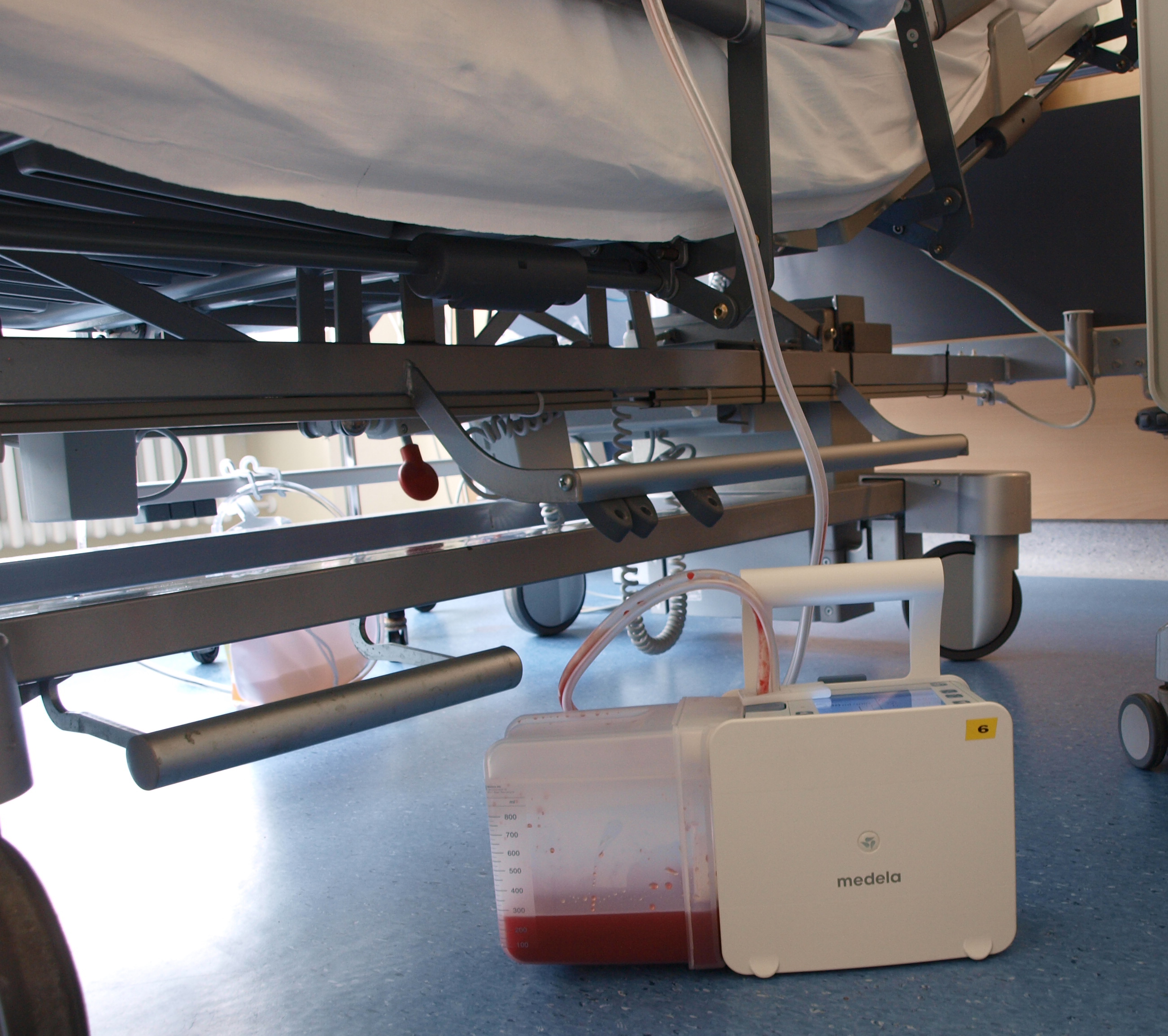
Portable electronic system

In modern portable, digital chest drainage systems, the collection chamber is integrated into the system. During the suction process, fluid will be collected in the chamber and air discharged into the atmosphere.

Digital chest drainage systems have many advantages compared to traditional, analogue systems:

- Mobility: enhanced mobility increases the quality of life and accelerates the recovery.
- Real time data collection: air leaks and fluid production can be tracked in real time by following the paddle-wheel-principle in ml/min
- Objective data measurement: discrepancies in evaluation of the clinical course are significantly lower when using an electronic system compared to classical systems.
- Double lumen tubing: allows for a separation of fluid and air, sub-atmospheric pressure is measured via the thinner of the two tubes. This allows one to monitor the sub-atmospheric pressure very close to the pleural space; therefore, the system works correctly, irrespective of where it is placed. Data measured next to the pleural space comes quite close to the real pressure within the pleural space
- Shortened drainage time: Healing is a dynamic process. On average, one day less is needed for chest drainage time when using electronic systems after anatomic resections
- Increased safety, reduced workload: alarm features increase safety of the treatment and reduce the workload of nursing staff

Electronic systems do not apply permanent suction but monitor the patient very closely and are activated when needed. On average, after an uncomplicated lobectomy, an electronic pump is active for 90 minutes within 2.5 days.
