= Duckbill valve =

Type of check valve

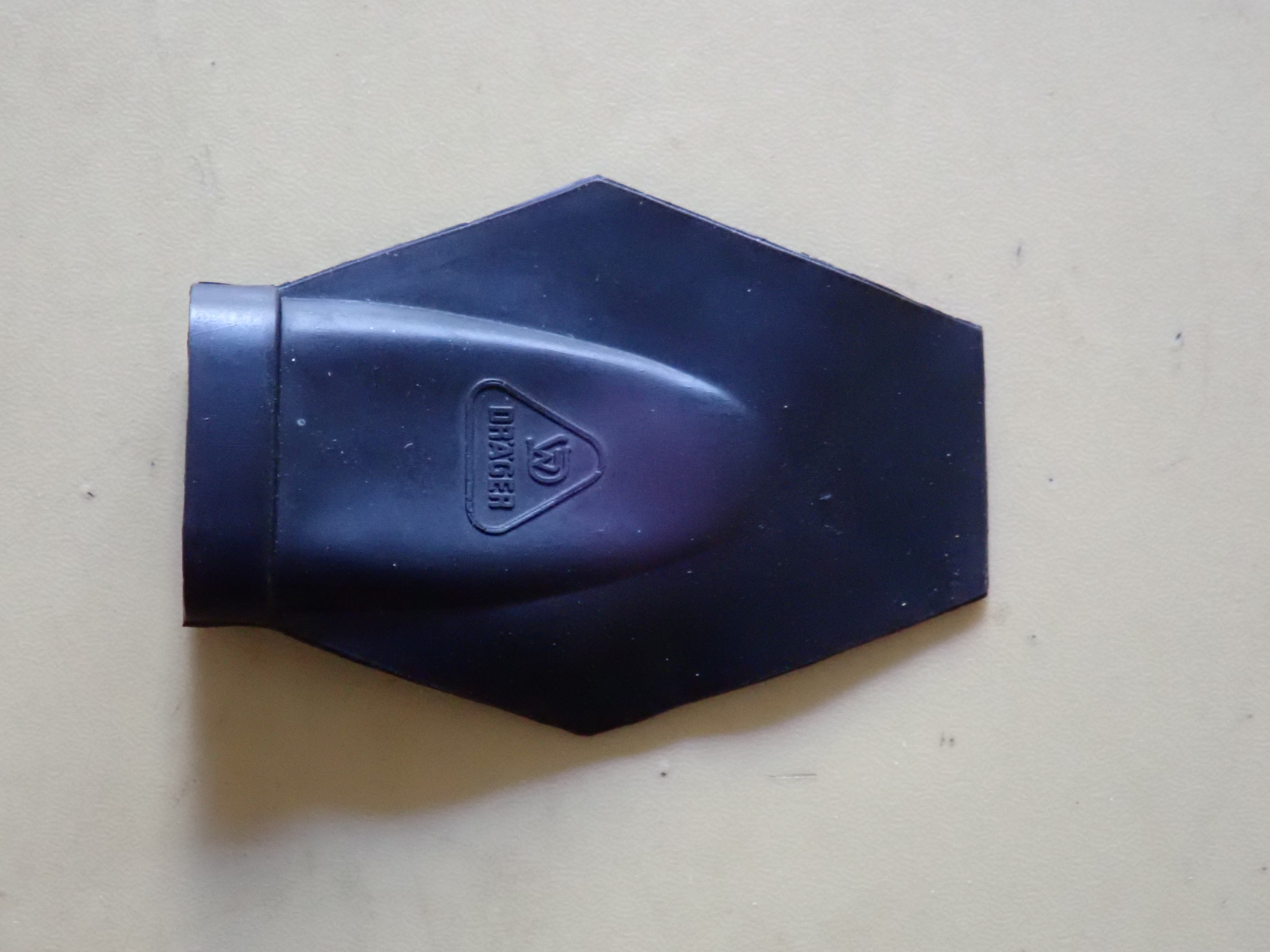
Duckbill exhaust valve for Draeger twin hose regulator

A duckbill valve is a check valve, usually manufactured from rubber or synthetic elastomer, and has two or more flaps, usually shaped like the beak of a duck. It is commonly used in medical applications to prevent contamination due to backflow.

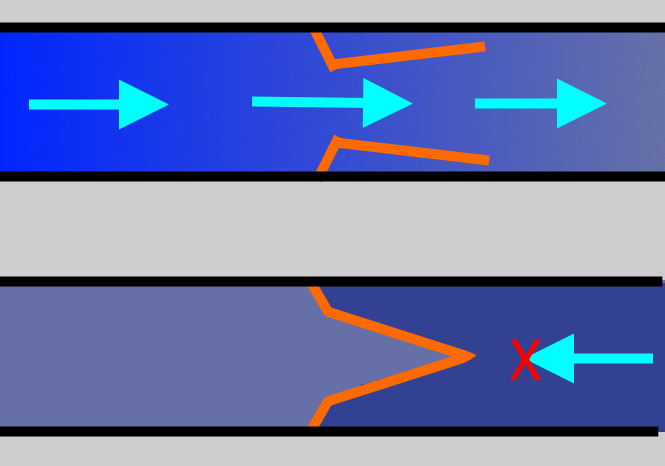
A cross-section diagram of a Duckbill valve. The upper pipe depicts normal flow of fluid, while the lower pipe depicts stoppage of backflow.

One end of the valve is stretched over the outlet of a supply line, conforming itself to the shape of the line, usually round. The other end, the duckbill, retains its natural flattened shape. When a fluid is pumped through the supply line and therefore the duckbill, the flattened end opens to permit the pressurized fluid to pass. When pressure is removed, however, the duckbill end returns to its flattened shape, preventing backflow.

The duckbill valve is similar in function to the mitral valve in the heart. See also Heimlich valve.

A trifold form of this valve, known as a joker valve, is used in one popular marine toilet.

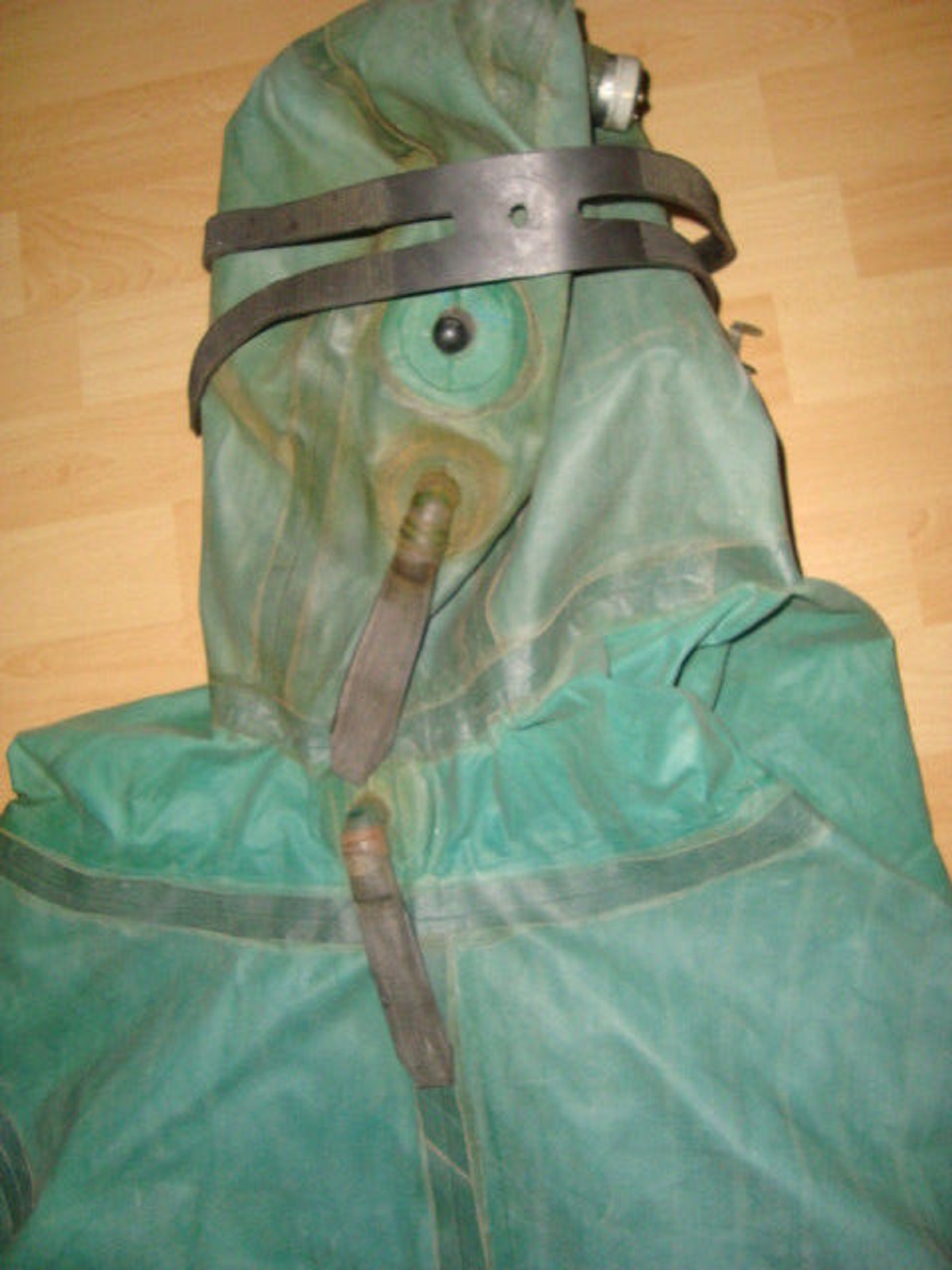
Duckbill valves attached to the hood and shoulders of a Soviet "GP" professional dry suit

Also known as a spear valve or flutter valve, this automatic device serves as a gas exhaust valve on the inside of some twin-hose diving regulators and as an excess gas release valve on the outside of certain mid-twentieth-century dry diving suits.
