= Flutter valve =

Valve used in respiratory medicine

In respiratory medicine, a flutter valve (also Pneumostat valve, and Heimlich valve) is a one-way check valve used to prevent airflow back into a chest tube, and usually is applied to drain air from a pneumothorax. The design of the flutter valve features a rubber sleeve in a plastic case, where the rubber sleeve is arranged so that when air flows through the valve the sleeve opens and allows the outwards airflow from the body of the patient; however, when the airflow is reversed, the rubber sleeve closes and halts backwards airflow into the body of the patient.

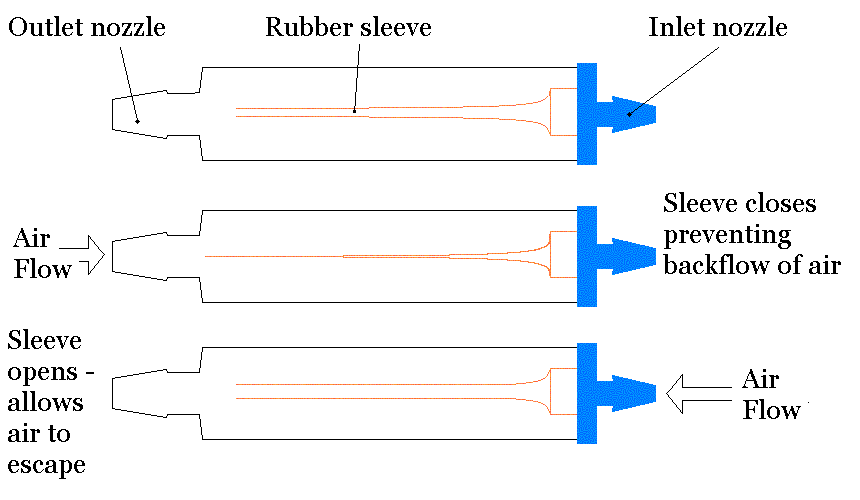
Heimlich valve: The flutter valve functions by allowing only outwards airflow from the body of the patient.

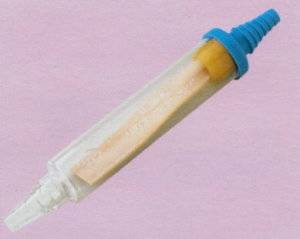
Photo depicting a Heimlich valve.

The construction of the flutter valve enables it to function as a one-way valve allowing airflow, or the flow of a fluid, in only one direction along the drainage tube. The end of the drainage tube is placed inside the chest cavity of the patient — into the air mass or into the fluid mass to be drained from the thorax. The flutter valve is placed in the appropriate orientation (designed so that the valve can only be connected in the appropriate orientation) and the pneumothorax is thus evacuated from the chest of the patient.

Usage of the flutter valve presents potential problems such as clogging of the chest tube, which might provoke the recurrence of the pneumothorax or the subcutaneous emphysema, which can lead to empyema. Another potential problem leaks of fluid, which are resolved with a small chest-drain; or with a sputum-trap attached to the valve, to function as a reservoir of the draining fluid. Flutter valves (Pneumostat valves) allow patients to ambulate more easily and patients may be able leave the hospital in certain instances. The traditional chest tube collection box often requires a longer hospital stay. Additional to the Heimlich valve, a chest-drainage management system, which typically enables the application of vacuum, and the quantification of the effluent; however, a drainage-management system is much a larger apparatus with more tubing, which encumbers the patient.

== See also ==
- Duckbill valve – Type of check valve
