= Chest tube =

Type of surgical drain

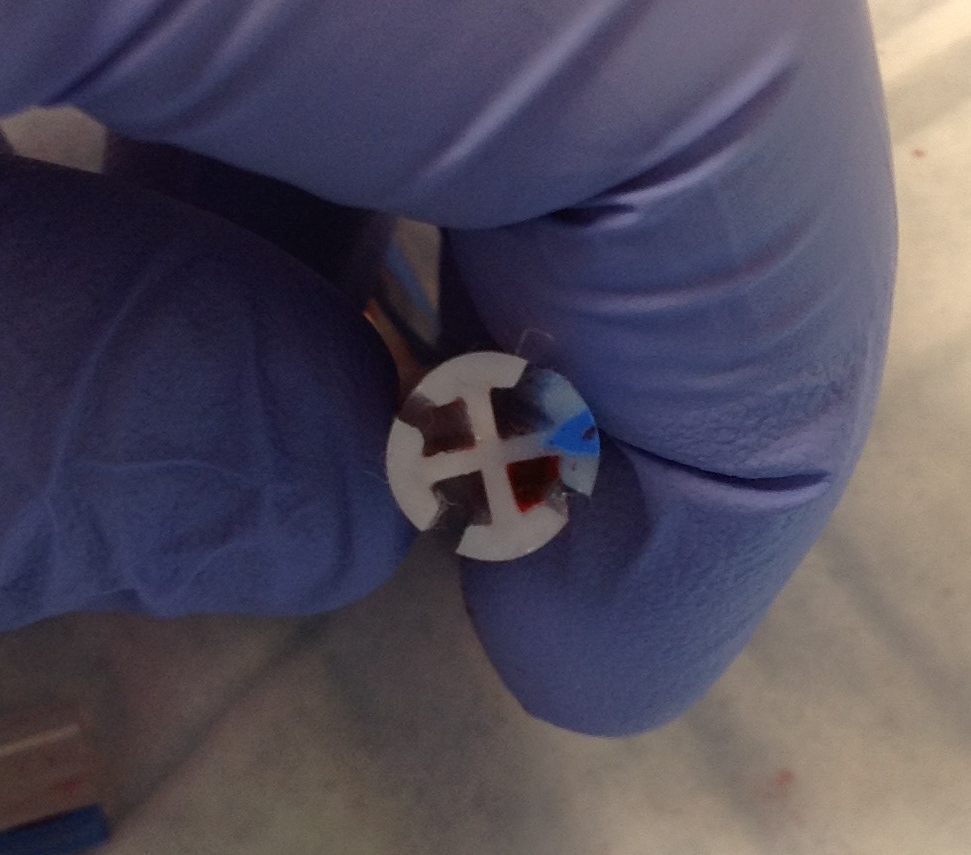
- The free end of the chest drainage device is usually attached to an underwater seal, below the level of the chest. This allows the air or fluid to escape from the pleural space and prevents anything returning to the chest.
- Other names: Intercostal drain
- Specialty: Pulmonology
- ICD-9-CM: 34.04
- MeSH: D013907

A chest tube (also chest drain, thoracic catheter, tube thoracostomy or intercostal drain) is a surgical drain that is inserted through the chest wall and into the pleural space or the mediastinum. The insertion of the tube can be lifesaving. The tube can be used to remove air (pneumothorax), excess fluid (pleural effusion or hydrothorax), blood (hemothorax), chyle (chylothorax) or pus (empyema) from the intrathoracic space. An intrapleural chest tube is also known as a Bülau drain or an intercostal catheter (ICC), and can either be a thin, flexible silicone tube (known as a "pigtail" drain), or a larger, semi-rigid, fenestrated plastic tube, which often involves a flutter valve or underwater seal.

The concept of chest drainage was first advocated by Hippocrates when he described the treatment of empyema by means of incision, cautery and insertion of metal tubes. However, the technique was not widely used until the influenza epidemic of 1918 to evacuate post-pneumonic empyema, which was first documented by Dr. C. Pope, on a 22-month-old infant. The use of chest tubes in postoperative thoracic care was reported in 1922, and they were regularly used post-thoracotomy in World War II, though they were not routinely used for emergency tube thoracostomy following acute trauma until the Korean War.

== Uses ==
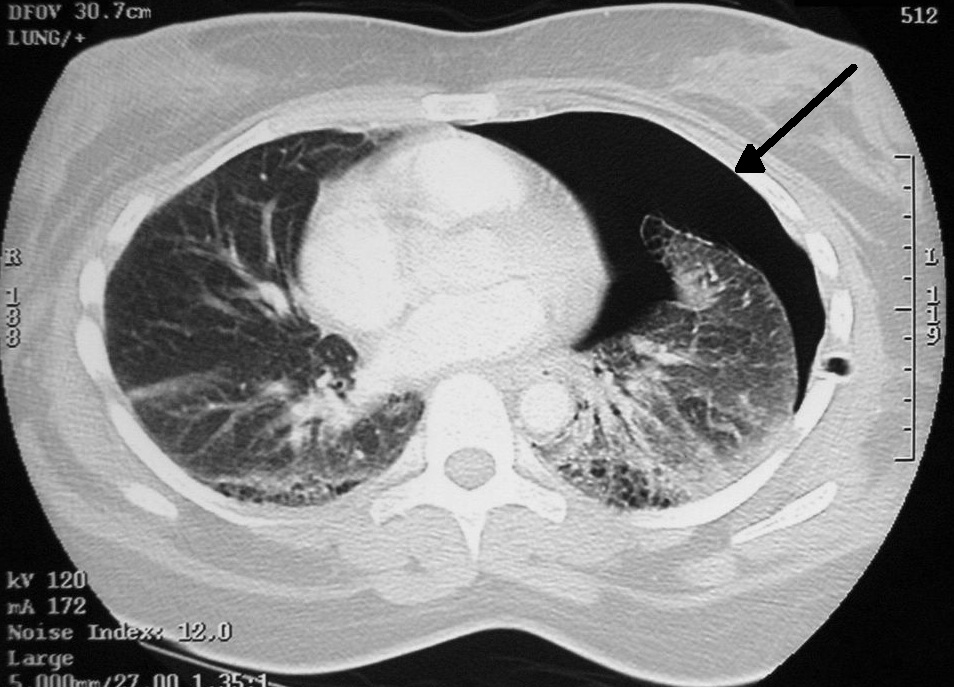
Left-sided pneumothorax (right side of image) on CT scan of the chest with chest tube in place.

Medical uses of chest tube include in emergency situations (for example in the case of a collapsed lung, or pneumothorax) and also after surgery to drain fluid and air from the chest, allow the lung to re-expand and prevent post-surgical complications. List of specific medical uses:

- Pneumothorax: accumulation of air or gas in the pleural space
- Pleural effusion: accumulation of fluid in the pleural space
  - Chylothorax: a collection of lymph in the pleural space
  - Empyema: a pyogenic infection of the pleural space
  - Hemothorax: accumulation of blood in the pleural space
  - Hydrothorax: accumulation of serous fluid in the pleural space
  - Urinothorax: accumulation of urine in the pleural space

== Contraindications ==
Contraindications to chest tube placement include refractory coagulopathy and presence of a diaphragmatic hernia, as well as hepatic hydrothorax. Additional contraindications include scarring in the pleural space (adhesions).

== Complications ==
Complications that are sometimes associated with chest tubes include the potential for clogging, air leaks, infection, hemorrhage, re-expansion pulmonary edema. Injury to the liver, spleen or diaphragm is also possible if the tube is placed behind (inferior) to the pleural cavity or is mispositioned. Injuries to the thoracic aorta and heart can also occur. The rate of complications of chest tubes inserted for trauma-related treatment needs has been estimated at 19%. The rate of complications is variable and other estimations have been made that share a rate of closer to 40%.

=== Insertional complications ===
Complications that arise while the chest tube is being inserted or within the first day of the insertional procedure include a risk of injury to organs near the insertional site.

=== Positional complications ===
Complications that arise after the tube has been inserted for one day or longer include the potential for tube blockages (obstruction), air leaks, kinking, or entrapment in the lung fissure once the lung has been expanded. Chest tube clogging can lead to retained blood around the heart and lungs that can contribute to complications and increase mortality. A common complication after thoracic surgery that arises within 30–50% of patients are air leaks. If a chest tube clogs when there is an air leak the patient will develop a pneumothorax. This can be life-threatening. Here, digital chest drainage systems can provide real time information as they monitor intra-pleural pressure and air leak flow, constantly. Keeping vigilant about chest tube clogging is imperative for the team taking care of the patient in the early postoperative period.

Minor complications include a subcutaneous hematoma or seroma, anxiety, shortness of breath, and cough (after removing large volume of fluid). In most cases, the chest tube related pain goes away after the chest tube is removed, however, chronic pain related to chest tube induced scarring of the intercostal space is not uncommon.

Subcutaneous emphysema indicates backpressure created by undrained air, often caused by a clogged chest tube or insufficient negative pressure. If a person has subcutaneous emphysema, it is likely their chest tube is not draining and consideration should be given if it should be unclogged or another tube should be placed so that the air leaking from the lung can be adequately drained.

=== Infections ===
Problems keeping the site clean or with sterilizing instruments can lead to infections. When chest tubes are placed due to either blunt or penetrating trauma, antibiotics may decrease the risks of infectious complications.

=== Removal complications ===
There is also a risk of complications after the chest tube has been removed. Potential complications include problems with re-sealing the chest that can lead to trapped air or if a foreign object is retained in the chest after the procedure.

== Device ==
=== Characteristics ===
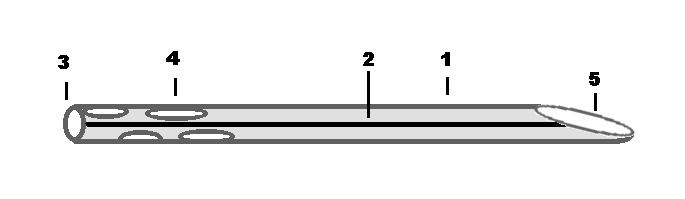
Size of chest tube: Adult male = 28–32 Fr Pp Adult female = 28 Fr Child = 18 Fr Newborn = 12–14 Fr

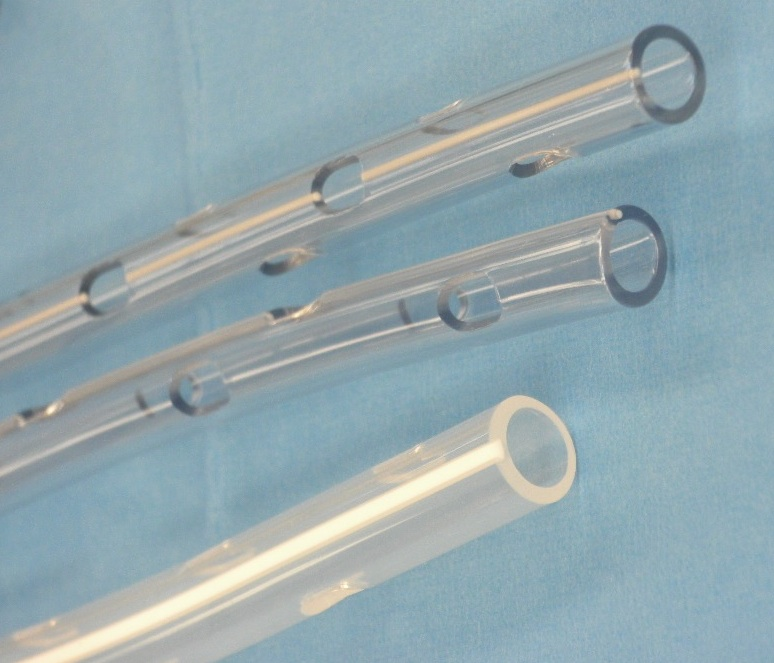
Chest tube drainage holes

Chest tubes are commonly made from clear plastics like PVC and soft silicone. Chest tubes are made in a range of sizes measured by their external diameter from 6 Fr to 40 Fr. Chest tubes, like most catheters, are measured in French catheter scale. For adults, 20 Fr to 40 Fr (6.7 to 13.3mm external diameter) are commonly used, and 6 Fr to 26 Fr for children. Conventional chest tubes feature multiple drainage fenestrations in the section of the tube which resides inside the patient, as well as distance markers along the length of the tube, and a radiopaque stripe which outlines the first drainage hole. Chest tubes are also provided in right angle, trocar, flared, and tapered configurations for different drainage needs. As well, some chest tubes are coated with heparin to help prevent thrombus formation, though the effect of this is disputed.

Chest tube have an end hole (proximal, toward the patient) and a series of side holes. The number of side holes is generally 6 on most chest tubes. The length of tube that has side holes is the effective drainage length (EDL). In chest tubes designed for pediatric heart surgery, the EDL is shorter, generally by only having 4 side holes.

Channel style chest drains, also called Blake drains, are so-called silastic drains made of silicone and feature open flutes that reside inside the patient. Drainage is thought to be achieved by capillary action, allowing the fluids to travel through the open grooves into a closed cross section, which contains the fluid and allows it to be suctioned through the tube. Though these chest tubes are more expensive than conventional ones, they are theoretically less painful.

=== Chest drainage system ===
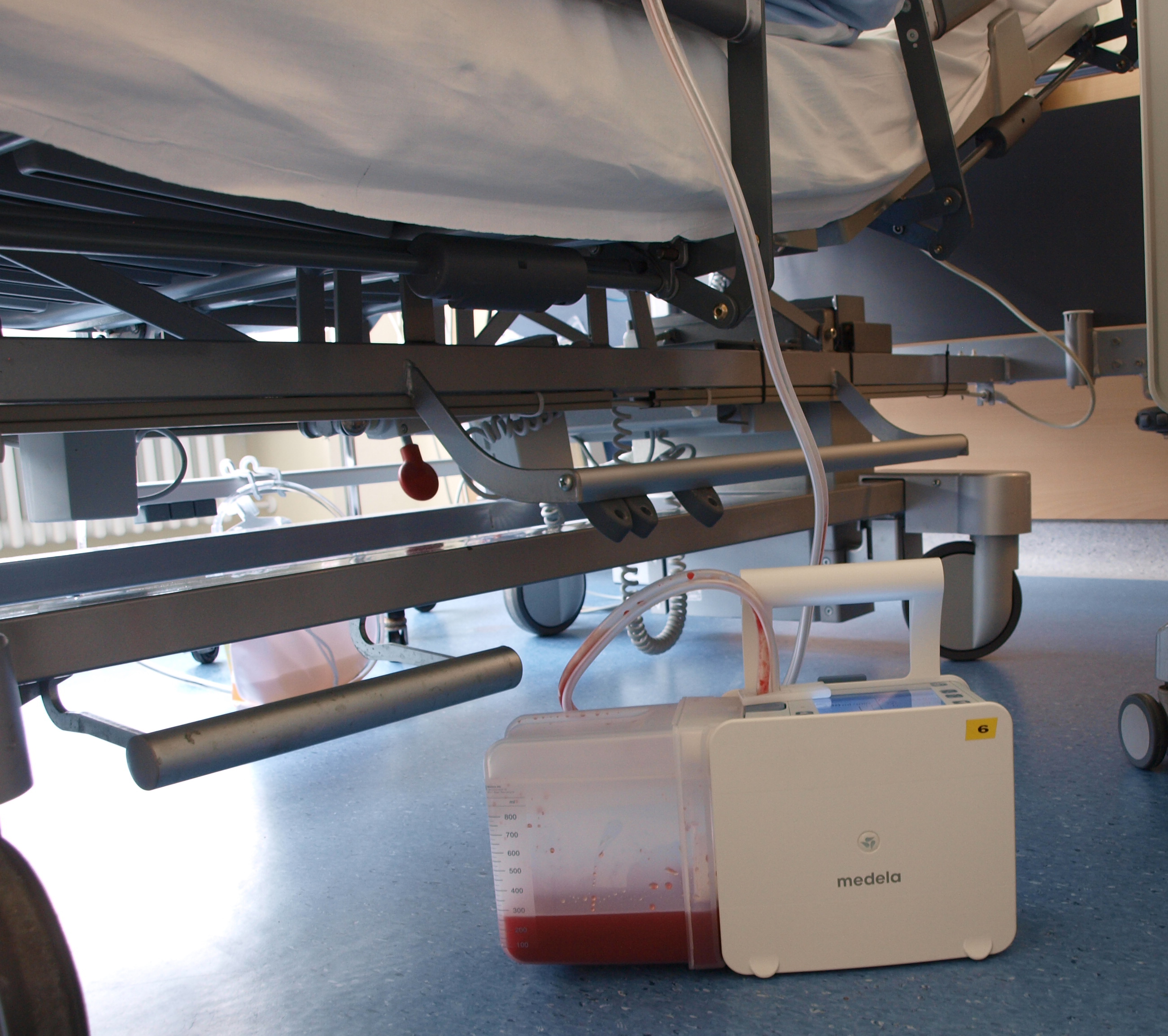
Portable electronic system

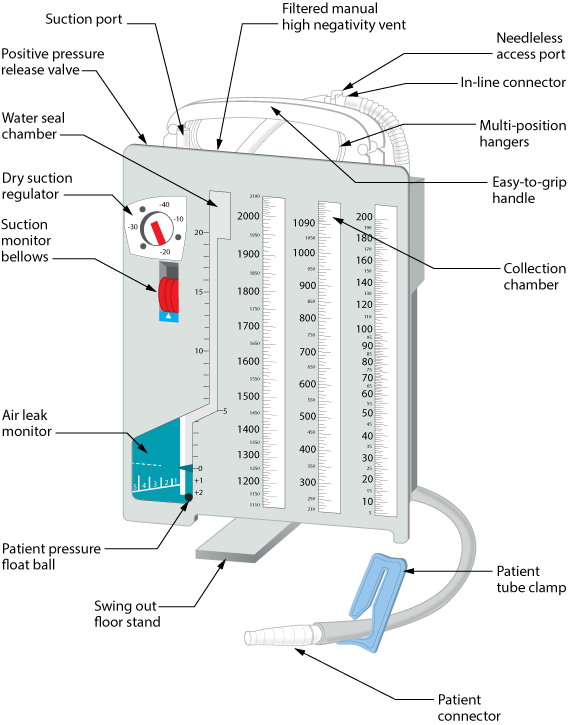
Chest tube drainage system diagram, with parts labeled in

A chest drainage system is typically used to collect chest drainage (air, blood, effusions). Most commonly, drainage systems use three chambers which are based on the three-bottle system. The first chamber allows fluid that is drained from the chest to be collected. The second chamber functions as a "water seal", which acts as a one way valve allowing gas to escape, but not reenter the chest. Air bubbling through the water seal chamber is usual when the patient coughs or exhales but may indicate, if continual, a pleural or system leak that should be evaluated critically. It can also indicate a leak of air from the lung. The third chamber is the suction control chamber. The height of the water in this chamber regulates the negative pressure applied to the system. A gentle bubbling through the water column minimizes evaporation of the fluid and indicates that the suction is being regulated to the height of the water column. In this way, increased wall suction does not increase the negative pressure of the system. Newer drainage systems eliminate the water seal using a mechanical check-valve, and some also use a mechanical regulator to regulate the suction pressure. Systems which employ both these are dubbed "dry" systems, whereas systems that retain the water seal but use a mechanical regulator are called "wet-dry" systems. Systems which use a water seal and water column regulator are called "wet" systems. Dry systems are advantageous as tip-overs of wet systems can spill and mix with blood, mandating the replacement of the system. Even newer systems are smaller and more ambulatory so the patient can be sent home for drainage if indicated.

The free end of the tube is usually attached to an underwater seal, below the level of the chest. This allows the air or fluid to escape from the pleural space, and prevents anything returning to the chest. Alternatively, the tube can be attached to a flutter valve. This allows patients with pneumothorax to remain more mobile.

More recently digital or electronic chest drainage systems have been introduced. An onboard motor is used as vacuum source along with an integrated suction control canister and water seal. These systems monitor the patient and will alert if the measured data are out of range. Due to the digital control of the negative pressure, the system is able to objectively quantify the presence of a pleural or system leak. Digital drainage systems allow clinicians to mobilize patients early, even for those on continuous suction, which is difficult to accomplish with the traditional water-seal system under suction. Application of such systems can also lead to a reduction in complications.

== Technique ==
=== Thoracostomy ===
It can be inserted in an area described as the "safe zone", which is a region bordered by the lateral border of pectoralis major, a horizontal line inferior to the axilla, the anterior border of latissimus dorsi and a horizontal line superior to the nipple. This should translate to the tube being inserted into the fifth intercostal space slightly anterior to the mid axillary line.

Chest tubes are usually inserted under local anesthesia. The skin over the area of insertion is first cleansed with antiseptic solution, such as iodine, before sterile drapes are placed around the area. The local anesthetic is injected into the skin and down to the muscle, and after the area is numb a small incision is made in the skin and a passage made through the skin and muscle into the chest. The tube is placed through this passage. If necessary, patients may be given additional analgesics for the procedure. Once the tube is in place it is sutured to the skin to prevent it falling out and a dressing applied to the area. Once the drain is in place, a chest radiograph will be taken to check the location of the drain. The tube stays in for as long as there is air or fluid to be removed, or risk of air gathering.

Chest tubes can also be placed using a trocar, which is a pointed metallic bar used to guide the tube through the chest wall. This method is less popular due to an increased risk of iatrogenic lung injury. Placement using the Seldinger technique, in which a blunt guidewire is passed through a needle (over which the chest tube is then inserted) has been described.

Protocols to maintain chest tube patency by preventing chest tube clogging are necessary.

=== Postoperative drainage ===
The placement technique for postoperative drainage (e.g. cardiac surgery) differs from the technique used for emergency situations. At the completion of open cardiac procedures, chest tubes are placed through separate stab incisions, typically near the inferior aspect of the sternotomy incision. In some instances multiple drains may be used to evacuate the mediastinal, pericardial, and pleural spaces. The drainage holes are placed inside the patient and the chest tube is passed out through the incision. Once the tube is in place, it is sutured to the skin to prevent movement. The chest tube is then connected to the drainage canister using additional tubing and connectors and connected to a suction source, typically regulated to -20 cm of water.

=== Dressings ===
After suturing, dressings are applied for hygienical reasons covering the wound. First, a y-slit compress is used around the tube. Second, a compress (10 x 10 cm) is placed on top and finally an adhesive plaster is added in a way that tension is avoided. A bridle rein is recommended to fix the tube to the skin. This tape bridge will prevent the tube from moving backwards and the possibility to cause clogging. It also prevents pain as it reduces tension on the fixation stitch. Alternatively, a large adhesive plaster that functions like a tape bridge may be used.

=== Management ===
Chest tubes should be kept free of dependent loops, kinks, and obstructions which may prevent drainage. In general, chest tubes are not clamped except during insertion, removal, or when diagnosing air leaks.

Chest tube clogging with blood clots of fibrinous material is common. When this occurs, it can result in retained blood around the heart or lungs that can lead to complications such as hematoma that needs to be drained, effusions, empyema, or, in the long term, fibrothorax. Thus its critical to maintain chest tube patency. Manual manipulation, often called milking, stripping, fan folding, or tapping, of chest tubes is commonly performed to clear chest tube obstructions. However these approaches are controversial. No conclusive evidence has demonstrated that any of these techniques are more effective than the others, and no method has shown to improve chest tube drainage. Furthermore, chest tube manipulation has proved to increase negative pressure, which may be detrimental, and painful to the patient. For these reasons, many hospitals do not allow these types of manual tube manipulations.

One option is active chest tube clearance without breaking the sterile field. According to a consensus of multiple experts in cardiac surgery, anesthesia and critical care in 2019 the ERAS Guidelines for Perioperative Care recommends active clearance of chest tubes to prevent retained blood and other complications. Makeshift efforts such as open chest tube clearing that involves breaking the sterile environment separating the chest tube from the drainage canister tubing to suction it out should not be performed.

The chest tube can only be removed when the subject clinical condition is stable, the lungs are fully aerated as seen on chest X-ray, chest tube drainage is less than 200 cc per day, and there is no air leak into the lungs pleura.

=== Site of placement ===
In December 2018 the European Respiratory Journal published correspondences that raise the possibility of improving mobility as well as patient outcomes by placing a chest tube more optimally.
