= Air core =

Air core may refer to:

- Air core drilling, a form of rotary air drilling
- Air core gauge
- Air core (magnetic)
