= Rotary actuator =

AE motor

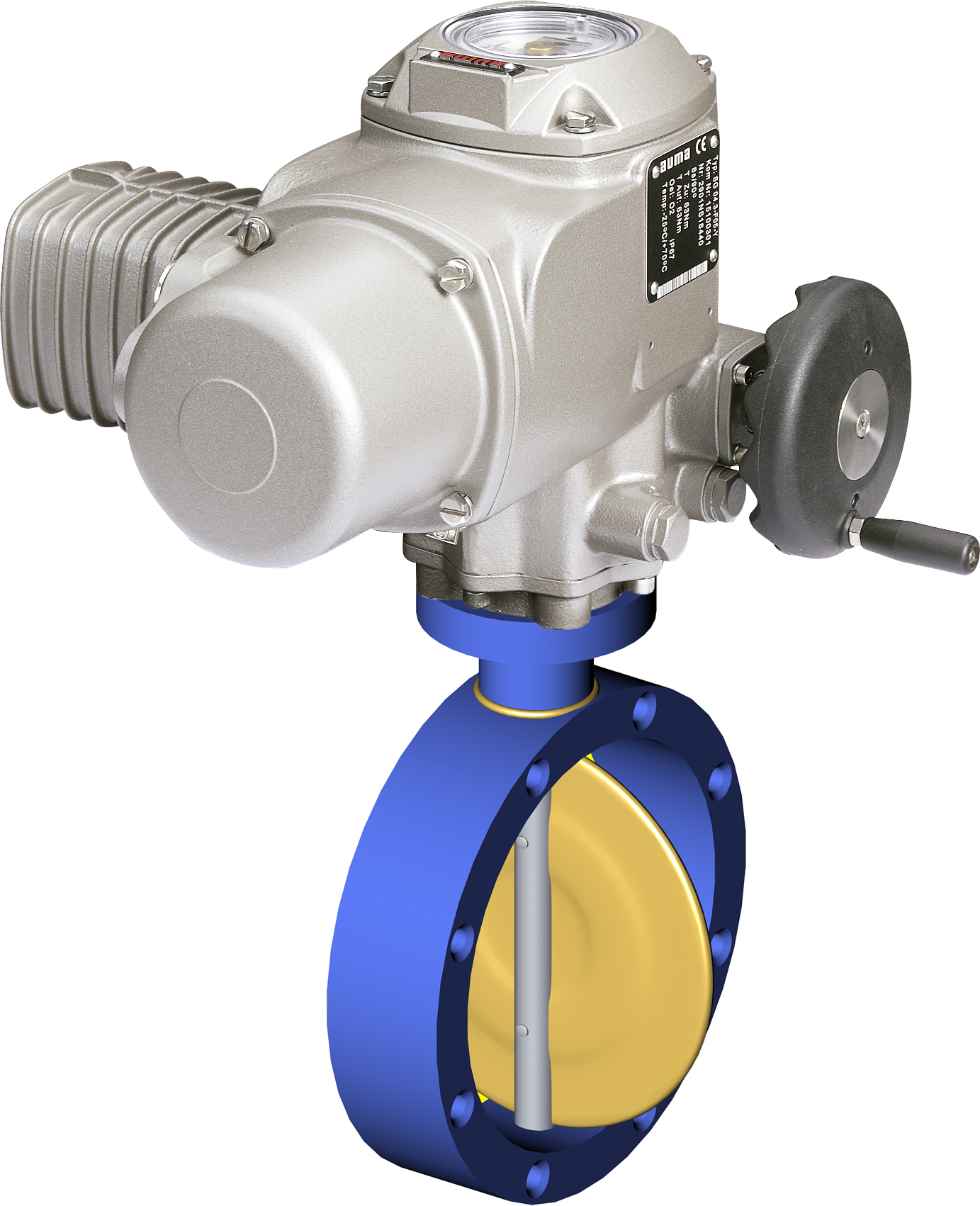
Electric rotary valve actuator controlling a butterfly valve

A rotary actuator is an actuator that produces a rotary motion or torque.

The simplest actuator is purely mechanical, where linear motion in one direction gives rise to rotation. The most common actuators are electrically powered; others may be powered pneumatically or hydraulically, or use energy stored in springs.

The motion produced by an actuator may be either continuous rotation, as for an electric motor, or movement to a fixed angular position as for servomotors and stepper motors. A further form, the torque motor, does not necessarily produce any rotation but merely generates a precise torque which then either causes rotation or is balanced by some opposing torque.

== Actuator power sources ==
=== Electric actuators ===
==== Stepper motors ====
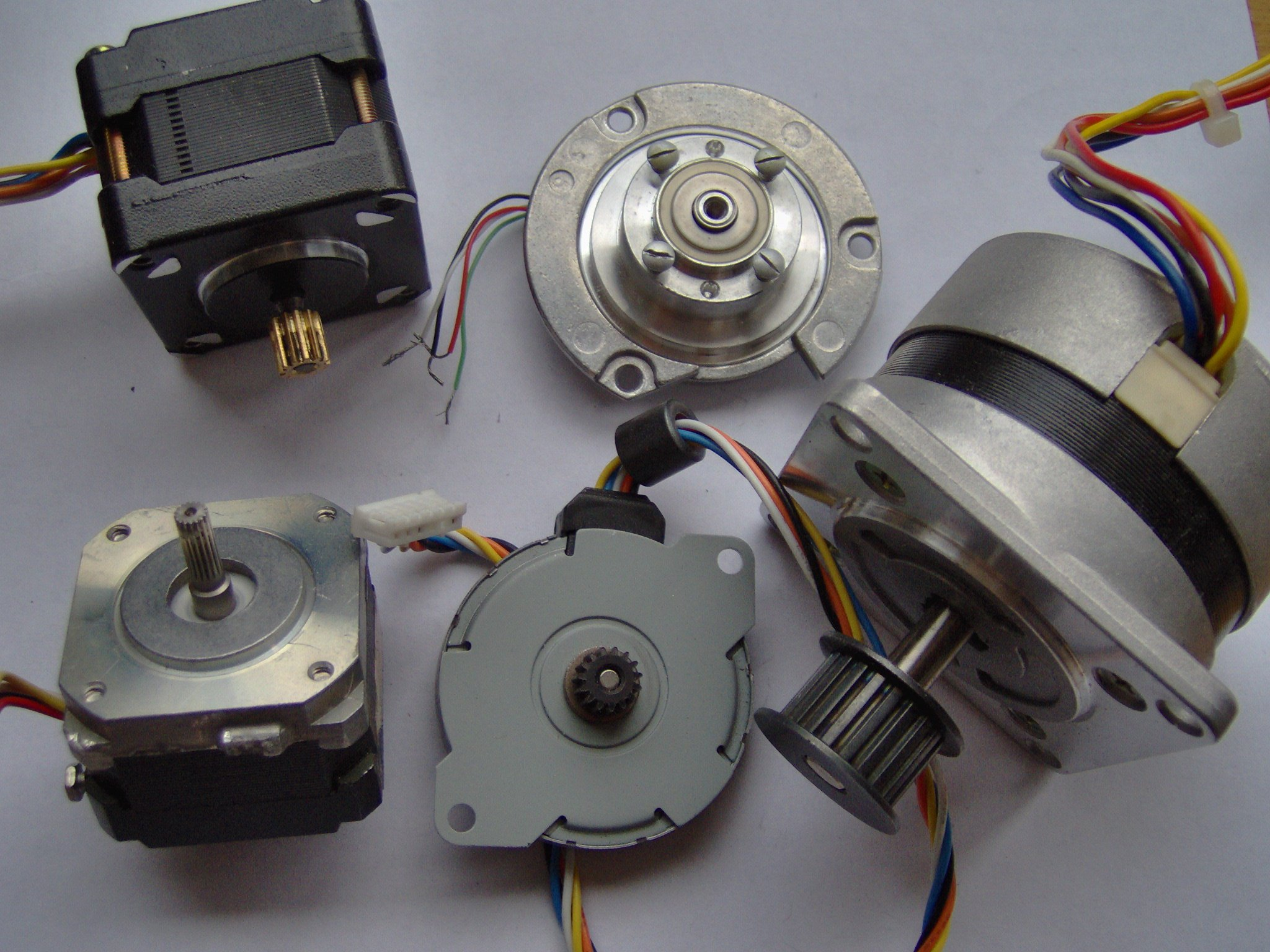
A variety of stepper motors

Stepper motors are a form of electric motor that has the ability to move in discrete steps of a fixed size. This can be used either to produce continuous rotation at a controlled speed or to move by a controlled angular amount. If the stepper is combined with either a position encoder or at least a single datum sensor at the zero position, it is possible to move the motor to any angular position and so to act as a rotary actuator.

==== Servomotors ====
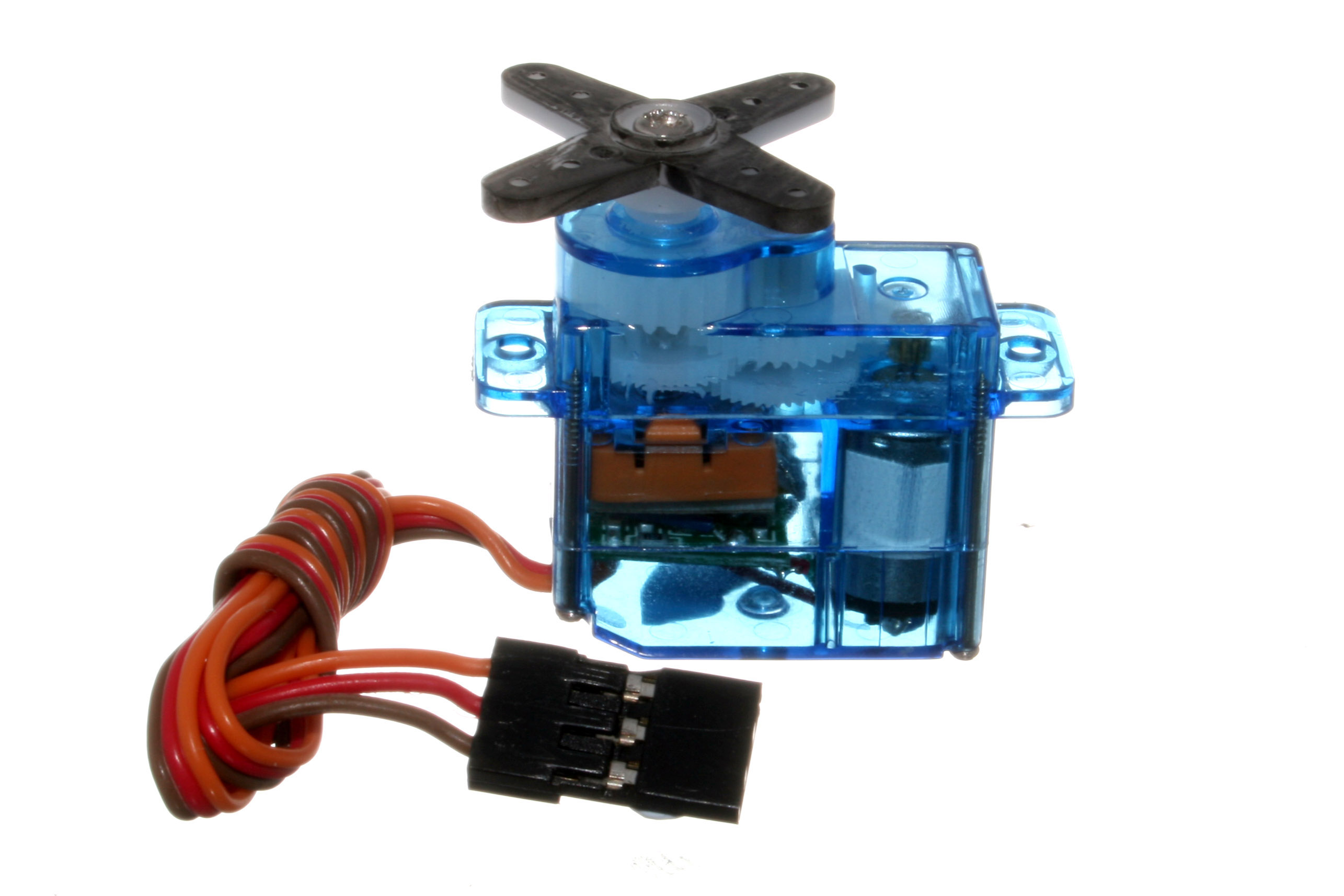
Radio control servo

A servomotor is a packaged assembly of several components: a motor (usually electric, although fluid power motors may also be used), a gear train to reduce the many rotations of the motor to a higher torque rotation, a position encoder that identifies the position of the output shaft and an inbuilt control system. The input control signal to the servo indicates the desired output position. Any difference between the position commanded and the position of the encoder gives rise to an error signal that causes the motor and geartrain to rotate until the encoder reflects a position matching that commanded.

A simple low-cost servo of this type is widely used for radio-controlled models.

==== Other types ====
A recent, and novel, form of ultra-lightweight actuator uses memory wire. As a current is applied, the wire is heated above its transition temperature and so changes shape, applying a torque to the output shaft. When power is removed, the wire cools and returns to its earlier shape.

=== Fluid power actuators ===
Hydraulic or pneumatic rotary actuator, using a rack and pinion

Both hydraulic and pneumatic power may be used to drive an actuator, usually the larger and more powerful types. As their internal construction is generally similar (in principle, if not in size) they are often considered together as fluid power actuators. Fluid power actuators are of two common forms: those where a linear piston and cylinder mechanism is geared to produce rotation (illustrated), and those where a rotating asymmetrical vane swings through a cylinder of two different radii. The differential pressure between the two sides of the vane gives rise to an unbalanced force and thus a torque on the output shaft. Vane actuators require a number of sliding seals and the joints between these seals have tended to cause more problems with leakage than for the piston and cylinder type.

==== Vacuum actuators ====
Where a supply of vacuum is available, but not pneumatic power, rotary actuators have even been made to work from vacuum power. The only common instance of these was for early automatic windscreen wipers on cars up until around 1960. These used the manifold vacuum of a petrol engine to work a quarter-turn oscillating vane actuator. Such windscreen wipers worked adequately when the engine was running under light load, but they were notorious that when working hard at top speed or climbing a hill, the manifold vacuum was reduced and the wipers slowed to a crawl.

== Applications ==
Rotary actuators are used in a vast range of applications. These require actuators of all sizes, power and operating speed. These can range from zero power actuators (Note: Zero power actuators are those, such as display gauges, that do not deliver a tangible output torque) that are only used as display devices, such as air core gauges. Others include valve actuators that operate pipeline and process valves in the petrochemical industry, through to actuators for large civil engineering projects such as sluice gates and dams. Examples are... Car wiper, etc
