= Pneumatic actuator =

Converts energy (typically in the form of compressed air) into mechanical motion

A pneumatic control valve actuator converts energy (typically in the form of compressed air) into mechanical motion. The motion can be rotary or linear, depending on the type of actuator.

== Principle of operation ==
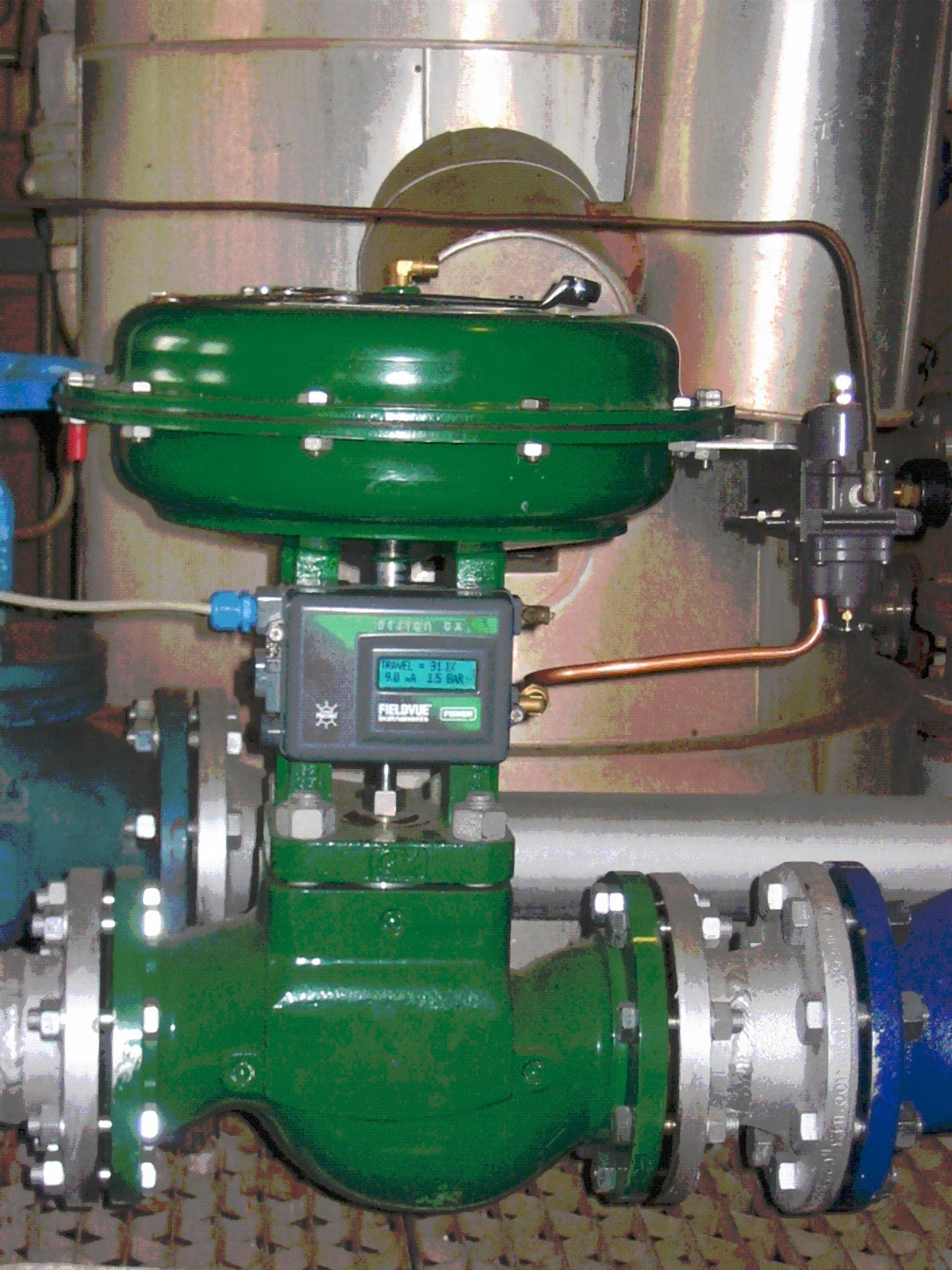
Valve with pneumatic diaphragm actuator and "smart" positioner which will also feed back to the controller the actual valve position

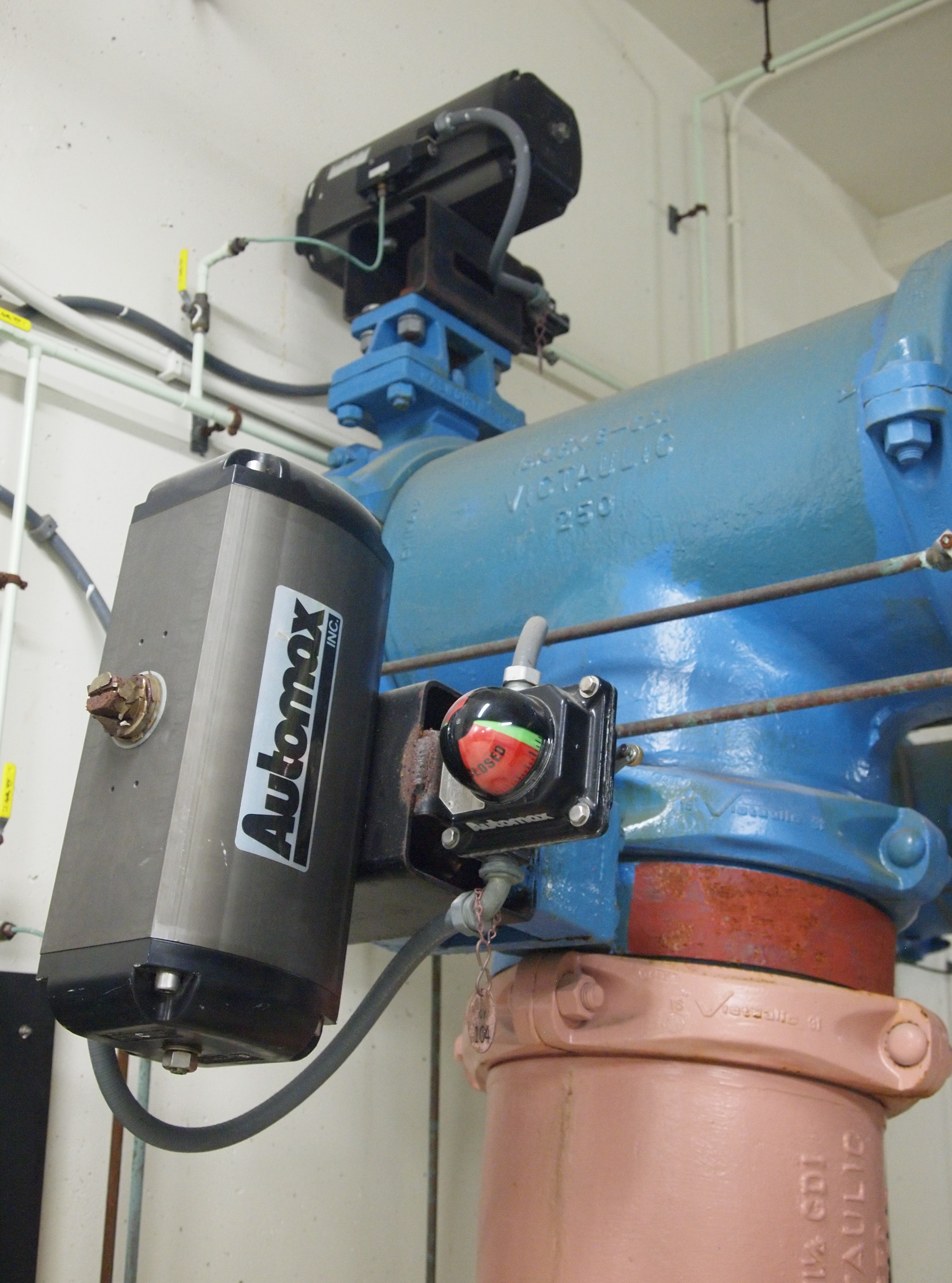
Pneumatic rack and pinion actuators for valve controls of water pipes

A pneumatic actuator mainly consists of a piston or a diaphragm which develops the motive power. It keeps the air in the upper portion of the cylinder, allowing air pressure to force the diaphragm or piston to move the valve stem or rotate the valve control element.

Valves require little pressure to operate and usually double or triple the input force. The larger the size of the piston, the larger the output pressure can be. Having a larger piston can also be good if the air supply is low, allowing the same forces with less input. These pressures are large enough to crush objects in the pipe. On 100 kPa input, you could lift a small car (upwards of 1,000 lbs) easily, and this is only a basic, small pneumatic valve. However, the resulting forces required of the stem would be too great and cause the valve stem to fail.

This pressure is transferred to the valve stem, which is connected to either the valve plug (see plug valve), butterfly valve etc. Larger forces are required in high pressure or high flow pipelines to allow the valve to overcome these forces, and allow it to move the valves moving parts to control the material flowing inside.

The valve's input is the "control signal." This can come from a variety of measuring devices, and each different pressure is a different set point for a valve. A typical standard signal is 20–100 kPa. For example, a valve could be controlling the pressure in a vessel that has a constant out-flow, and a varied in-flow (varied by the actuator and valve). A pressure transmitter will monitor the pressure in the vessel and transmit a signal from 20–100 kPa. 20 kPa means there is no pressure, 100 kPa means there is full range pressure (can be varied by the transmitters calibration points). As the pressure rises in the vessel, the output of the transmitter rises, this increase in pressure is sent to the valve, which causes the valve to stroke downward, and start closing the valve, decreasing flow into the vessel, reducing the pressure in the vessel as excess pressure is evacuated through the outflow. This is called a direct-acting process.

== Types ==
Some types of pneumatic actuators include:

- Tie-rod cylinders
- Rotary actuators
- Grippers
- Rodless actuators with a magnetic linkage or rotary cylinders
- Rodless actuators with mechanical linkage
- Pneumatic artificial muscles
- Vane Motors
- pneumatic actuator
- Pneumatic motors
- Speciality actuators that combine rotary and linear motion—frequently used for clamping operations
- Vacuum generators

== See also ==
- Pneumatic cylinder
- Pneumatics
