= Valve =

Flow control device

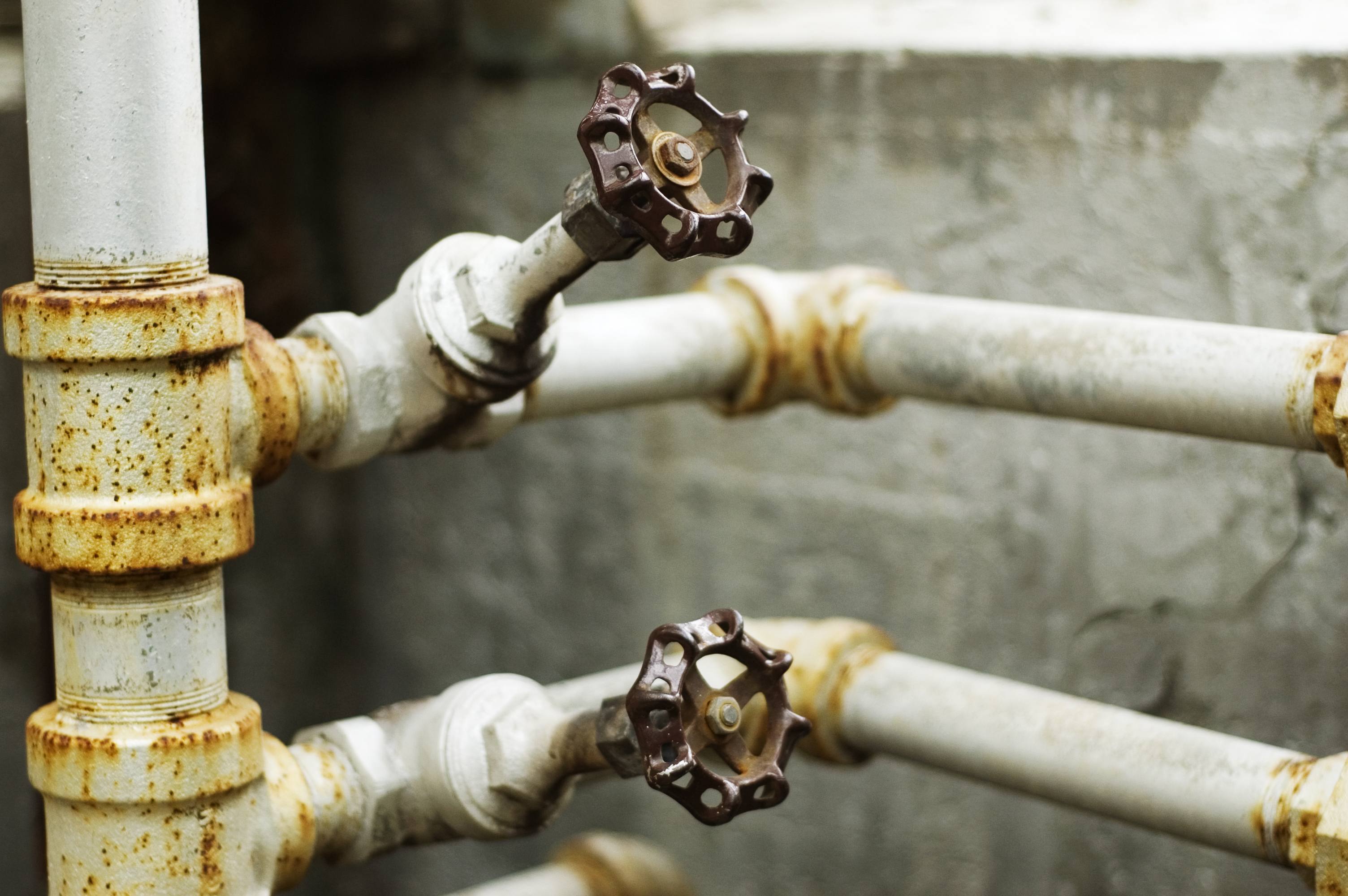
These water valves are operated by rotary handles.

A valve is a device or natural object that regulates, directs or controls the flow of a fluid (gases, liquids, fluidized solids, or slurries) by opening, closing, or partially obstructing various passageways. Valves are technically fittings, but are usually discussed as a separate category. In an open valve, fluid flows in a direction from higher pressure to lower pressure. The word is derived from the Latin valva, which describes the moving part of a door, in turn from volvere, which means to turn or roll.

The simplest, and very ancient, valve is simply a freely hinged flap which swings down to obstruct fluid (gas or liquid) flow in one direction, but is pushed up by the flow itself when the flow is moving in the opposite direction. This is called a check valve, as it prevents or "checks" the flow in one direction. Modern control valves may regulate pressure or flow downstream and operate on sophisticated automation systems.

Valves have many uses, including controlling water for irrigation, industrial uses for controlling processes, residential uses such as on/off and pressure control to dish and clothes washers and taps in the home. Valves are also used in the military and transport sectors. In HVAC ductwork and other near-atmospheric air flows, valves are instead called dampers. In compressed air systems, however, valves are used with the most common type being ball valves.

== Applications ==
Valves are found in virtually every industrial process, including water and sewage processing, mining, power generation, processing of oil, gas and petroleum, food manufacturing, chemical and plastic manufacturing and many other fields.

People in developed nations use valves in their daily lives, including plumbing valves, such as taps for tap water, gas control valves on cookers, small valves fitted to washing machines and dishwashers, safety devices fitted to hot water systems, and poppet valves in car engines.

In nature, there are valves, for example one-way valves in veins controlling the blood circulation, and heart valves controlling the flow of blood in the chambers of the heart and maintaining the correct pumping action.

Valves may be operated by a handle, lever, pedal or wheel. Valves may also be automatic, driven by changes in pressure, temperature, or flow. These changes may act upon a diaphragm or a piston which in turn activates the valve. Common examples of this type of valve are safety valves fitted to hot water systems or boilers.

More complex control systems using valves requiring automatic control based on an external input (i.e., regulating flow through a pipe to a changing set point) require an actuator. An actuator will stroke the valve depending on its input and set-up, allowing the valve to be positioned accurately, and allowing control over a variety of requirements.

== Variation ==
Valves vary widely in form and application. Sizes typically range from 0.1 mm to 60 cm. Specialized purpose valves can have a diameter exceeding five meters.

Disposable valves may be found in common household items including mini-pump dispensers and aerosol cans.

A common use of the term valve refers to the poppet valves found in the vast majority of modern internal combustion engines, such as those in most fossil-fuel–powered vehicles, which are used to control the intake of the fuel–air mixture and allow exhaust gas venting.

== Types ==
Valves are quite diverse and may be classified into a number of basic types. Valves may also be classified by how they are actuated:

- Hydraulic
- Pneumatic
- Manual
- Solenoid valve
- Motor

== Components ==
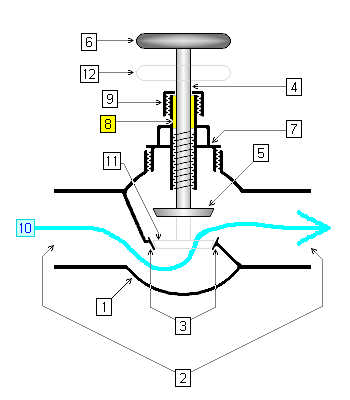
Cross-sectional diagram of an open globe valve: 1. body; 2. ports; 3. seat; 4. stem; 5. disc when valve is open; 6. handle or handwheel when valve is open; 7. bonnet; 8. packing; 9. gland nut; 10. fluid flow when valve is open; 11. position of disc if valve were shut; 12. position of handle or handwheel if valve were shut

The main parts of the most usual type of valve are the body and the bonnet. These two parts form the casing that holds the fluid going through the valve.

=== Body ===
The valve's body is the outer casing of most or all of the valve that contains the internal parts, or trim. The bonnet is the part of the encasing through which the stem (see below) passes and that forms a guide and seal for the stem. The bonnet typically screws into or is bolted to the valve body.

Valve bodies are usually metallic or plastic. Brass, bronze, gunmetal, cast iron, steel, alloy steels and stainless steels are very common. Seawater applications, like desalination plants, often use duplex valves, as well as super duplex valves, due to their corrosion resistant properties, particularly against warm seawater. Alloy 20 valves are typically used in sulphuric acid plants, whilst monel valves are used in hydrofluoric acid (HF Acid) plants. Hastelloy valves are often used in high temperature applications, such as nuclear plants, whilst inconel valves are often used in hydrogen applications. Plastic bodies are used for relatively low pressures and temperatures. PVC, PP, PVDF and glass-reinforced nylon are common plastics used for valve bodies.

=== Bonnet ===
A bonnet acts as a cover on the valve body. It is commonly semi-permanently screwed into the valve body or bolted onto it. During manufacture of the valve, the internal parts are put into the body and then the bonnet is attached to hold everything together inside. To access internal parts of a valve, a user would take off the bonnet, usually for maintenance. Many valves do not have bonnets; for example, plug valves usually do not have bonnets. Many ball valves do not have bonnets since the valve body is put together in a different style, such as being screwed together at the middle of the valve body.

=== Ports ===
Ports are passages that allow fluid to pass through the valve. Ports are obstructed by the valve member or disc to control flow. Valves most commonly have two ports, but may have as many as 20. The valve is almost always connected at its ports to pipes or other components. Connection methods include threadings, compression fittings, glue, cement, flanges, or welding.

=== Handle or actuator ===
A handle is used to manually control a valve from outside the valve body. Automatically controlled valves often do not have handles, but some may have a handle (or something similar) anyway to manually override automatic control, such as a stop-check valve. An actuator is a mechanism or device to automatically or remotely control a valve from outside the body. Some valves have neither handle nor actuator because they automatically control themselves from inside; for example, check valves and relief valves may have neither.

=== Disc ===
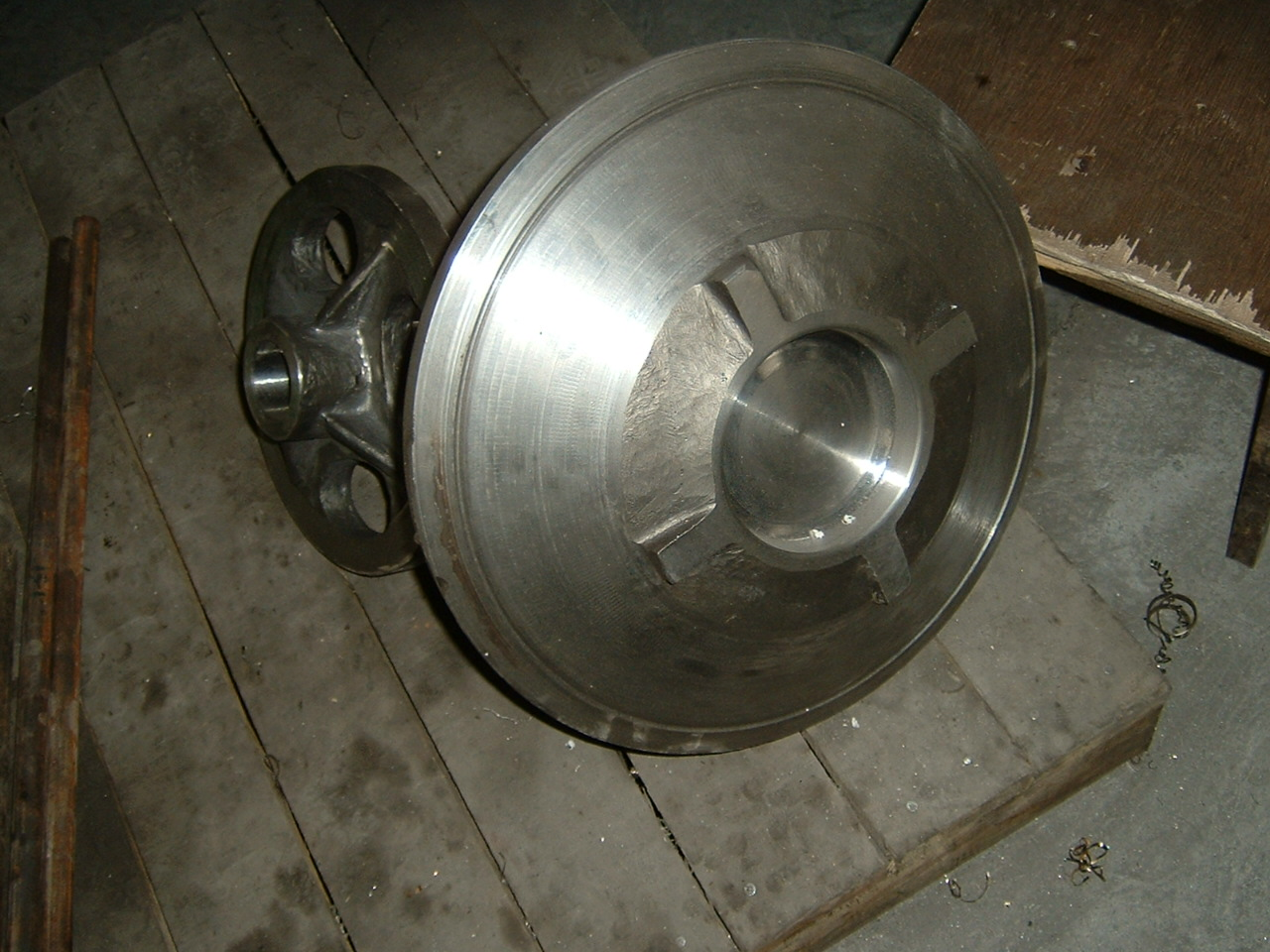
Valve disc

A disc, also known as a valve member, is a movable obstruction inside the stationary body that adjustably restricts flow through the valve. Although traditionally disc-shaped, discs come in various shapes. Depending on the type of valve, a disc can move linearly inside a valve, or rotate on the stem (as in a butterfly valve), or rotate on a hinge or trunnion (as in a check valve). A ball is a round valve member with one or more paths between ports passing through it. By rotating the ball, flow can be directed between different ports. Ball valves use spherical rotors with a cylindrical hole drilled as a fluid passage. Plug valves use cylindrical or conically tapered rotors called plugs. Other round shapes for rotors are possible as well in rotor valves, as long as the rotor can be turned inside the valve body. However, not all round or spherical discs are rotors; for example, a ball check valve uses the ball to block reverse flow, but is not a rotor because operating the valve does not involve rotation of the ball.

=== Seat ===
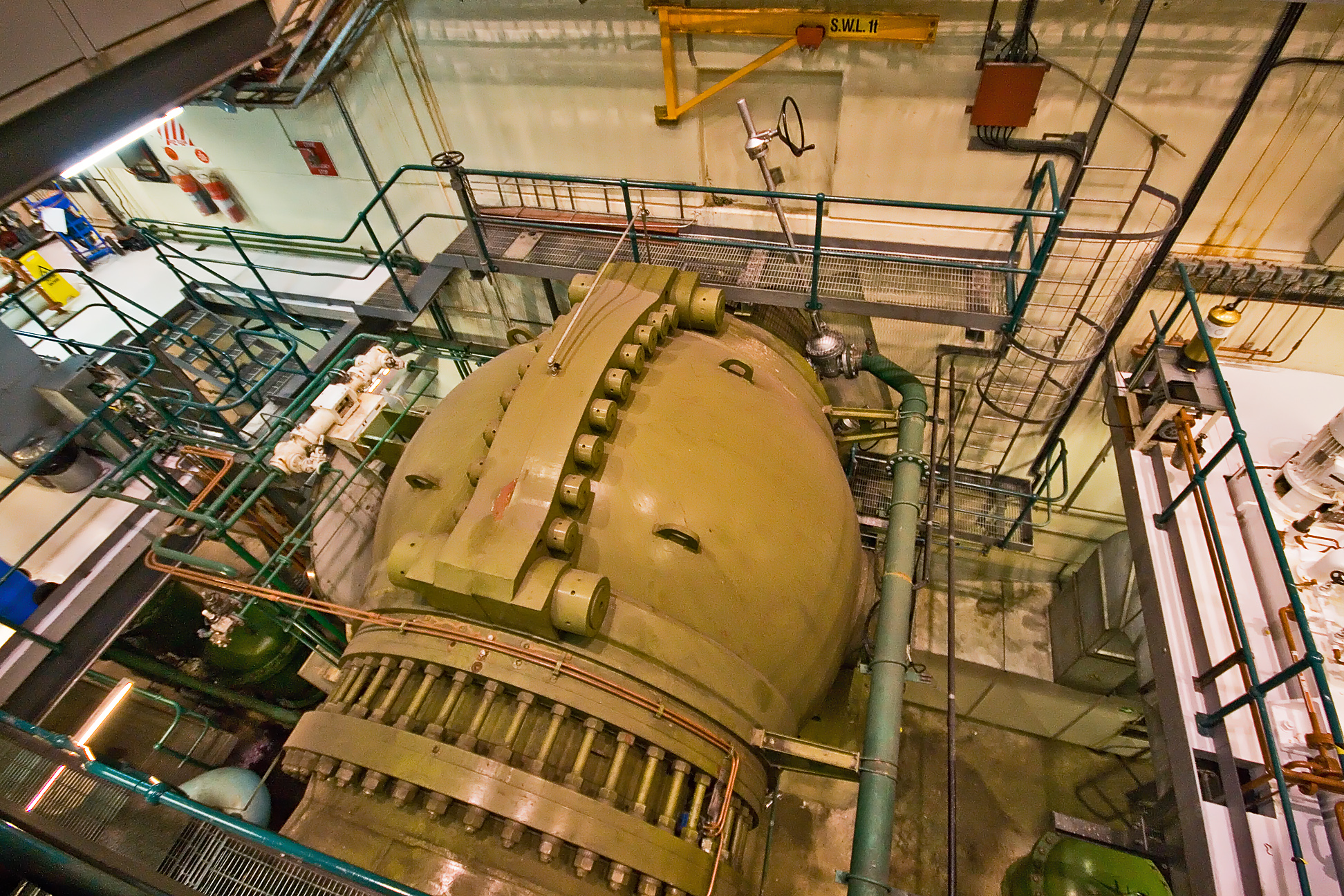
The shut off butterfly valve for a Francis turbine at Gordon Power Station, Tasmania

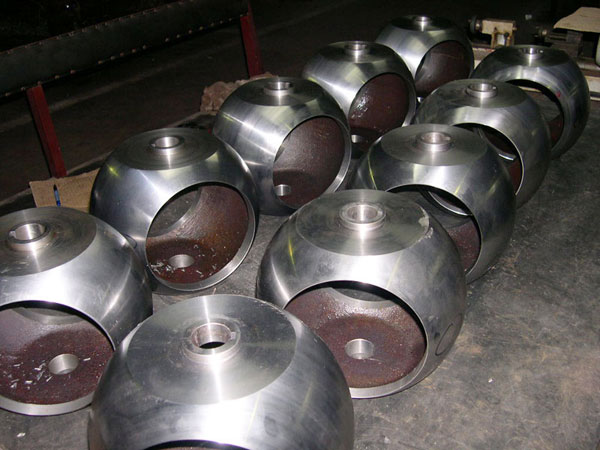
Ball valve

The "seat" is the interior surface of the body which contacts the disc to form a leak-tight seal. In discs that move linearly or swing on a hinge or trunnion, the disc comes into contact with the seat only when the valve is shut. In disks that rotate, the seat is always in contact with the disk, but the area of contact changes as the disc is turned. The seat always remains stationary relative to the body.

Seats are classified by whether they are cut directly into the body, or if they are made of a different material:

- Hard seats are integral to the valve body. Nearly all hard seated metal valves have a small amount of leakage.
- Soft seats are fitted to the valve body and made of softer materials such as PTFE or various elastomers such as NBR, EPDM, or FKM depending on the maximum operating temperature.

A closed soft seated valve is much less liable to leak when shut while hard seated valves are more durable. Gate, globe, and check valves are usually hard seated while butterfly, ball, plug, and diaphragm valves are usually soft seated.

=== Stem ===
The stem transmits motion from the handle or controlling device to the disc. The stem typically passes through the bonnet when present. In some cases, the stem and the disc can be combined in one piece, or the stem and the handle are combined in one piece.

The motion transmitted by the stem may be a linear force, a rotational torque, or some combination of these (Angle valve using torque reactor pin and Hub Assembly). The valve and stem can be threaded such that the stem can be screwed into or out of the valve by turning it in one direction or the other, thus moving the disc back or forth inside the body. Packing is often used between the stem and the bonnet to maintain a seal. Some valves have no external control and do not need a stem as in most check valves.

Valves whose disc is between the seat and the stem and where the stem moves in a direction into the valve to shut it are normally-seated or front seated. Valves whose seat is between the disc and the stem and where the stem moves in a direction out of the valve to shut it are reverse-seated or back seated. These terms don't apply to valves with no stem or valves using rotors.

=== Gaskets ===
Gaskets are the mechanical seals, or packings, used to prevent the leakage of a gas or fluids from valves.

=== Valve balls ===
A valve ball is also used for severe-duty, high-pressure, high-tolerance applications. They are typically made of stainless steel, titanium, Stellite, Hastelloy, brass, or nickel. They can also be made of different types of plastic, such as ABS, PVC, PP or PVDF.

=== Spring ===
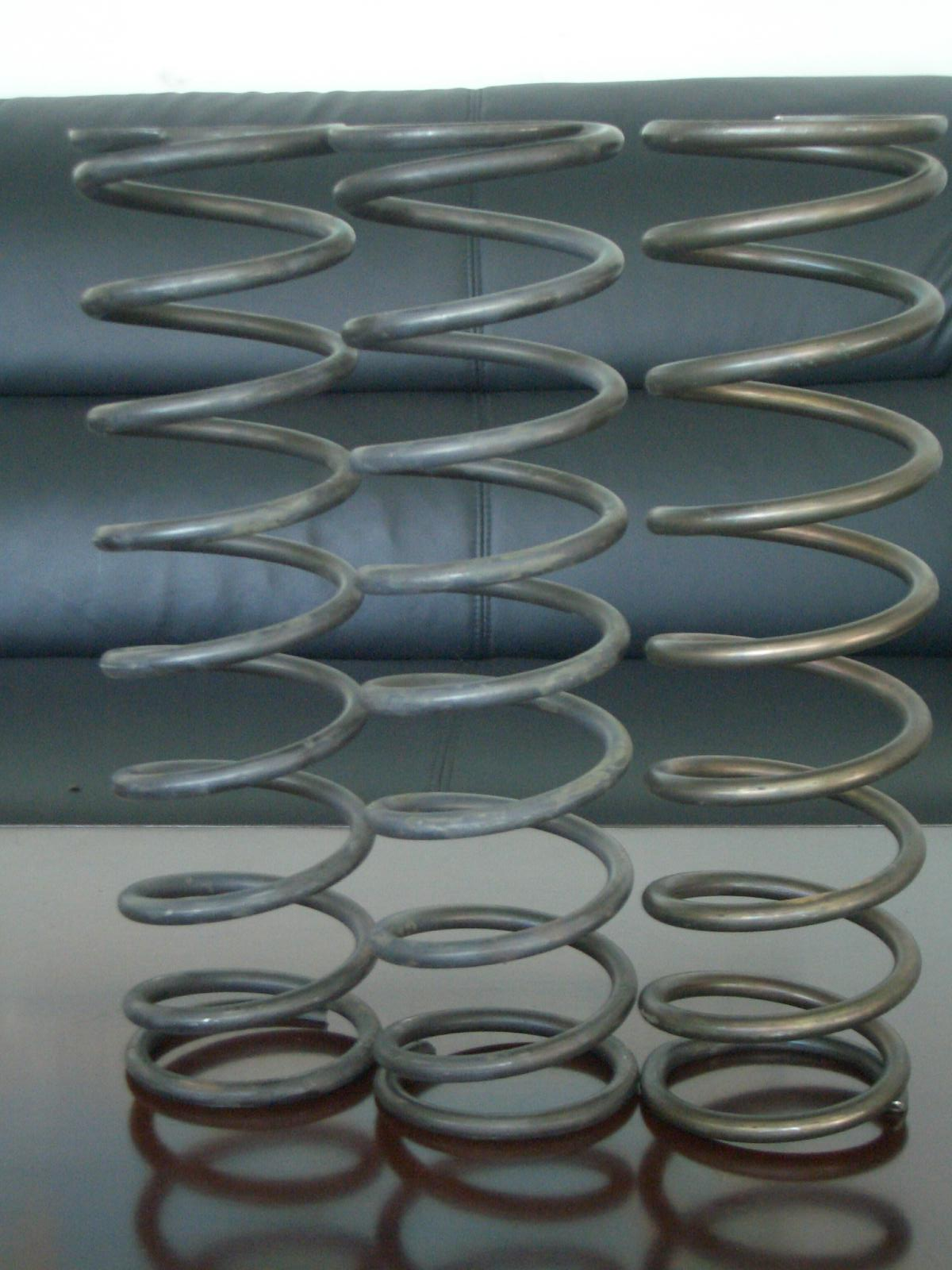
Inconel X750 spring

Many valves have a spring for spring-loading, to normally shift the disc into some position by default but allow control to reposition the disc. Relief valves commonly use a spring to keep the valve shut, but allow excessive pressure to force the valve open against the spring-loading. Coil springs are normally used. Typical spring materials include zinc plated steel, stainless steel, and for high temperature applications Inconel X750.

=== Trim ===
The internal elements of a valve are collectively referred to as a valve's trim. According to API Standards 600, "Steel Gate Valve-Flanged and Butt-welding Ends, Bolted Bonnets", the trim consists of stem, seating surface in the body, gate seating surface, bushing or a deposited weld for the backseat and stem hole guide, and small internal parts that normally contact the service fluid, excluding the pin that is used to make a stem-to-gate connection (this pin shall be made of an austenitic stainless steel material).

== Valve operating positions ==
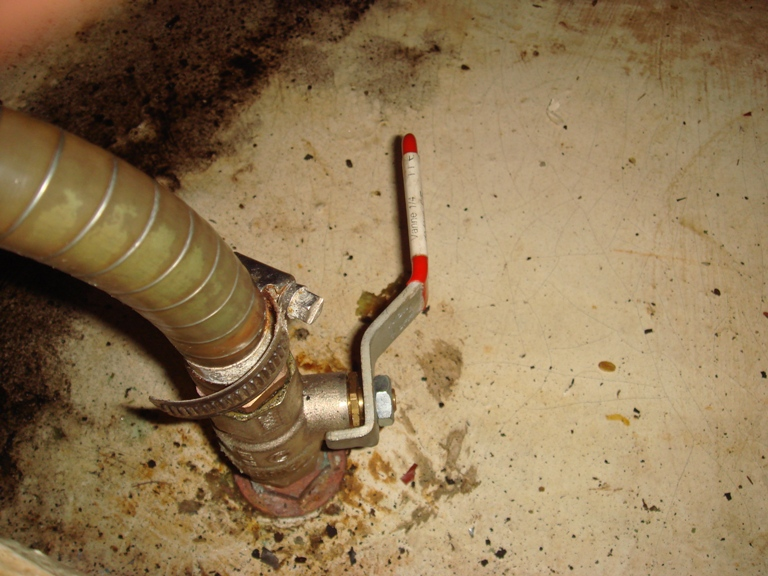
A seacock for cooling seawater, on a marine diesel engine. Seacocks are usually ball valves but may be other types.

Valve positions are operating conditions determined by the position of the disc or rotor in the valve. Some valves are made to be operated in a gradual change between two or more positions. Return valves and non-return valves allow fluid to move in two directions or only one, respectively.

=== Two-port valves ===
Operating positions for two-port valves can be either shut (closed) so that no flow at all goes through, fully open for maximum flow, or sometimes partially open to any degree in between. Many valves are not designed to precisely control intermediate degree of flow; such valves are considered to be either open or shut. Some valves are specially designed to regulate varying amounts of flow. Such valves have been called by various names such as regulating, throttling, metering, or needle valves. For example, needle valves have elongated conically tapered discs and matching seats for fine flow control. For some valves, there may be a mechanism to indicate by how much the valve is open, but in many cases other indications of flow rate are used, such as separate flow meters.

In plants with remote-controlled process operation, such as oil refineries and petrochemical plants, some two-way valves can be designated as normally closed (NC) or normally open (NO) during regular operation. Examples of normally closed valves are sampling valves, which are only opened while a sample is taken. Other examples of normally closed valves are emergency shutdown valves, which are kept open when the system is in operation and will automatically shut by taking away the power supply. This happens when there is a problem with a unit or a section of a fluid system such as a leak in order to isolate the problem from the rest of the system. Examples of normally-open valves are purge-gas supply valves or emergency-relief valves. When there is a problem these valves open (by switching them 'off') causing the unit to be flushed and emptied.

Although many two-way valves are made in which the flow can go in either direction between the two ports, when a valve is placed into a certain application, flow is often expected to go from one certain port on the upstream side of the valve, to the other port on the downstream side. Pressure regulators are variations of valves in which flow is controlled to produce a certain downstream pressure, if possible. They are often used to control flow of gas from a gas cylinder. A back-pressure regulator is a variation of a valve in which flow is controlled to maintain a certain upstream pressure, if possible.

=== Three-port valves ===
Schematic of a three-way ball valve: L-shaped ball right, T-shaped left

Valves with three ports serve many different functions. A few of the possibilities are listed here.

Three-way ball valves come with T- or L-shaped fluid passageways inside the rotor. The T valve might be used to permit connection of one inlet to either or both outlets or connection of the two outlets. The L valve could be used to permit disconnection of both or connection of either but not both of two inlets to one outlet.

Shuttle valves automatically connect the higher pressure inlet to the outlet while (in some configurations) preventing flow from one inlet to the other.

Single-handle mixer valves produce a variable mixture of hot and cold water at a variable flow rate under control of a single handle.

Thermostatic mixing valves mix hot and cold water to produce a constant temperature in the presence of variable pressures and temperatures on the two input ports.

=== Four-port valves ===
A four-port valve is a valve whose body has four ports equally spaced round the body and the disc has two passages to connect adjacent ports. It is operated with two positions.

It can be used to isolate and to simultaneously bypass a sampling cylinder installed on a pressurized water line. It is useful to take a fluid sample without affecting the pressure of a hydraulic system and to avoid degassing.

== Control ==
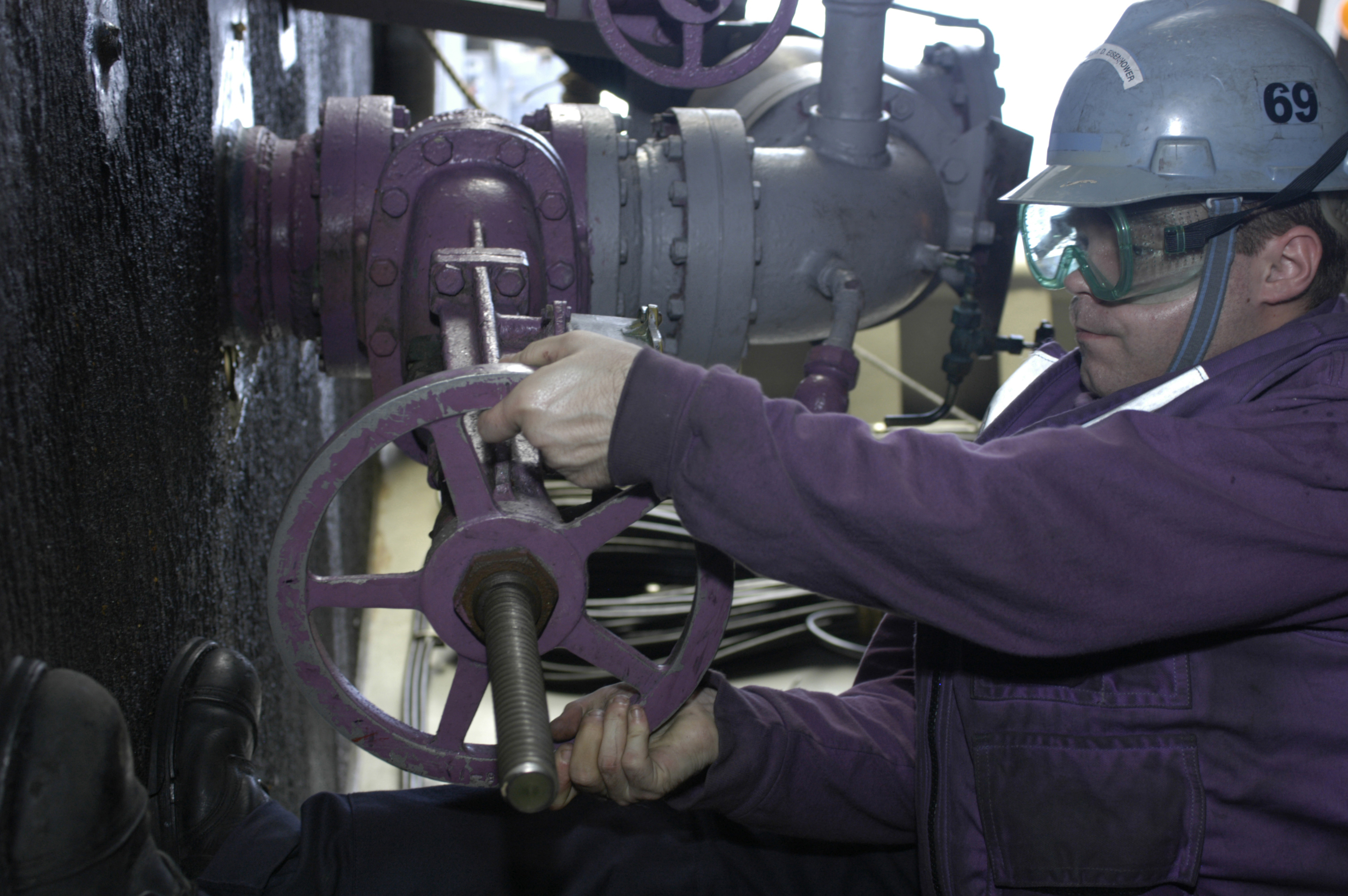
A sailor aboard a ship operates the wheel controlling a fuel valve.

Many valves are controlled manually with a handle attached to the stem. If the handle is turned ninety degrees between operating positions, the valve is called a quarter-turn valve. Butterfly, ball valves, and plug valves are often quarter-turn valves. If the handle is circular with the stem as the axis of rotation in the center of the circle, then the handle is called a handwheel. Valves can also be controlled by actuators attached to the stem. They can be electromechanical actuators such as an electric motor or solenoid, pneumatic actuators which are controlled by air pressure, or hydraulic actuators which are controlled by the pressure of a liquid such as oil or water. Actuators can be used for the purposes of automatic control such as in washing machine cycles, remote control such as the use of a centralised control room, or because manual control is too difficult such as when the valve is very large. Pneumatic actuators and hydraulic actuators need pressurised air or liquid lines to supply the actuator: an inlet line and an outlet line. Pilot valves are valves which are used to control other valves. Pilot valves in the actuator lines control the supply of air or liquid going to the actuators.

The fill valve in a toilet water tank is a liquid level-actuated valve. When a high water level is reached, a mechanism shuts the valve which fills the tank.

In some valve designs, the pressure of the flow fluid itself or pressure difference of the flow fluid between the ports automatically controls flow through the valve.

== Other considerations ==
Valves are typically rated for maximum temperature and pressure by the manufacturer. The wetted materials in a valve are usually identified also. Some valves rated at very high pressures are available. When a designer, engineer, or user decides to use a valve for an application, he/she should ensure the rated maximum temperature and pressure are never exceeded and that the wetted materials are compatible with the fluid the valve interior is exposed to. In Europe, valve design and pressure ratings are subject to statutory regulation under the Pressure Equipment Directive 97/23/EC (PED).

Some fluid system designs, especially in chemical or power plants, are schematically represented in piping and instrumentation diagrams. In such diagrams, different types of valves are represented by certain symbols.

Valves in good condition should be leak-free. However, valves may eventually wear out from use and develop a leak, either between the inside and outside of the valve or, when the valve is shut to stop flow, between the disc and the seat. A particle trapped between the seat and disc could also cause such leakage.

== Images ==
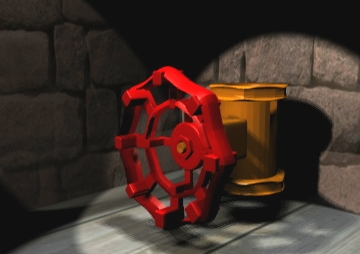
Globe valve

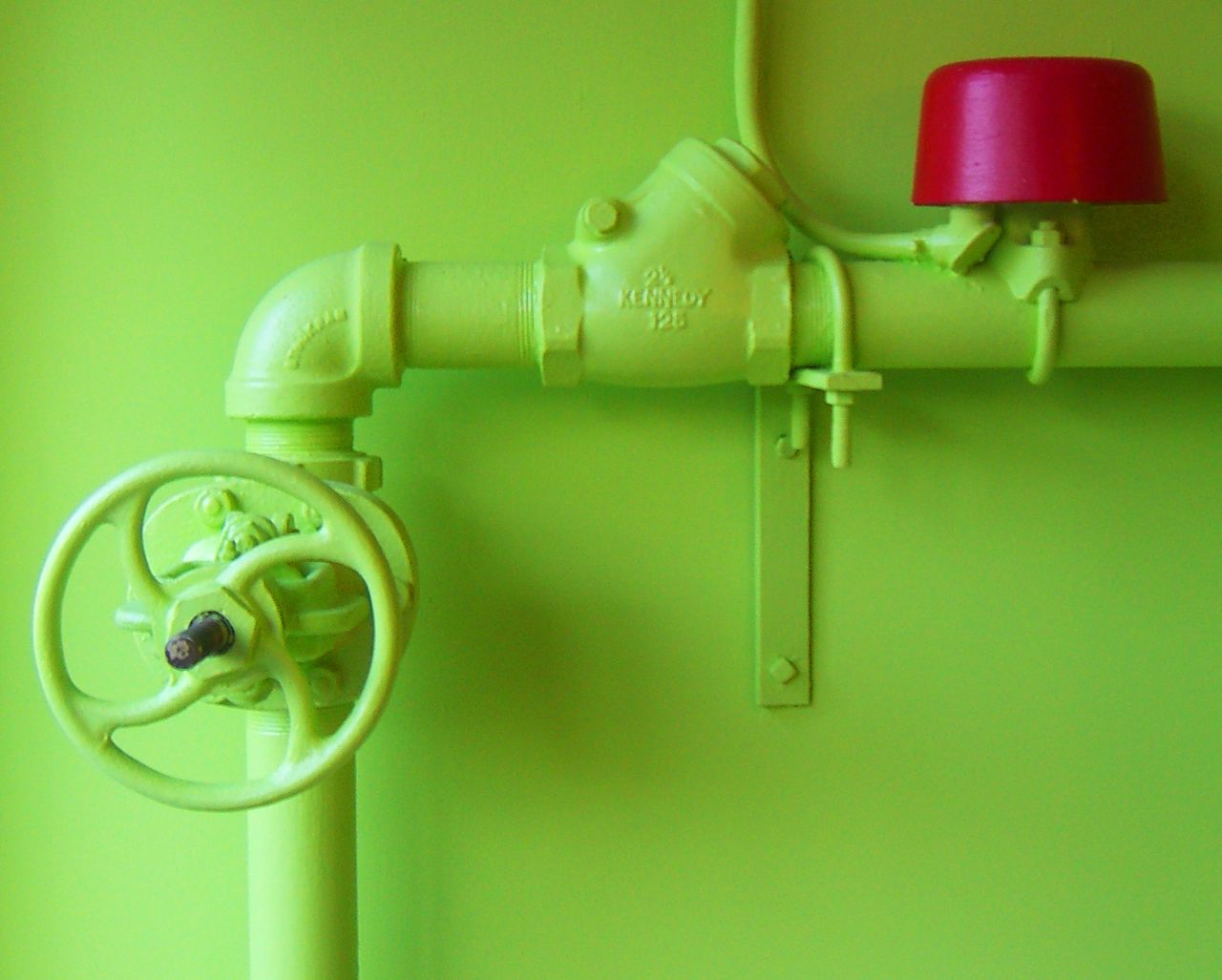
A valve controlled by a wheel (on vertical line)

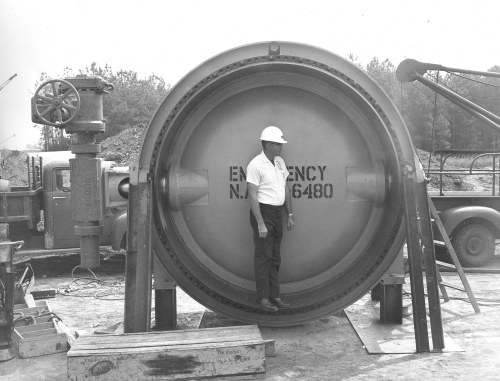
Large butterfly valve

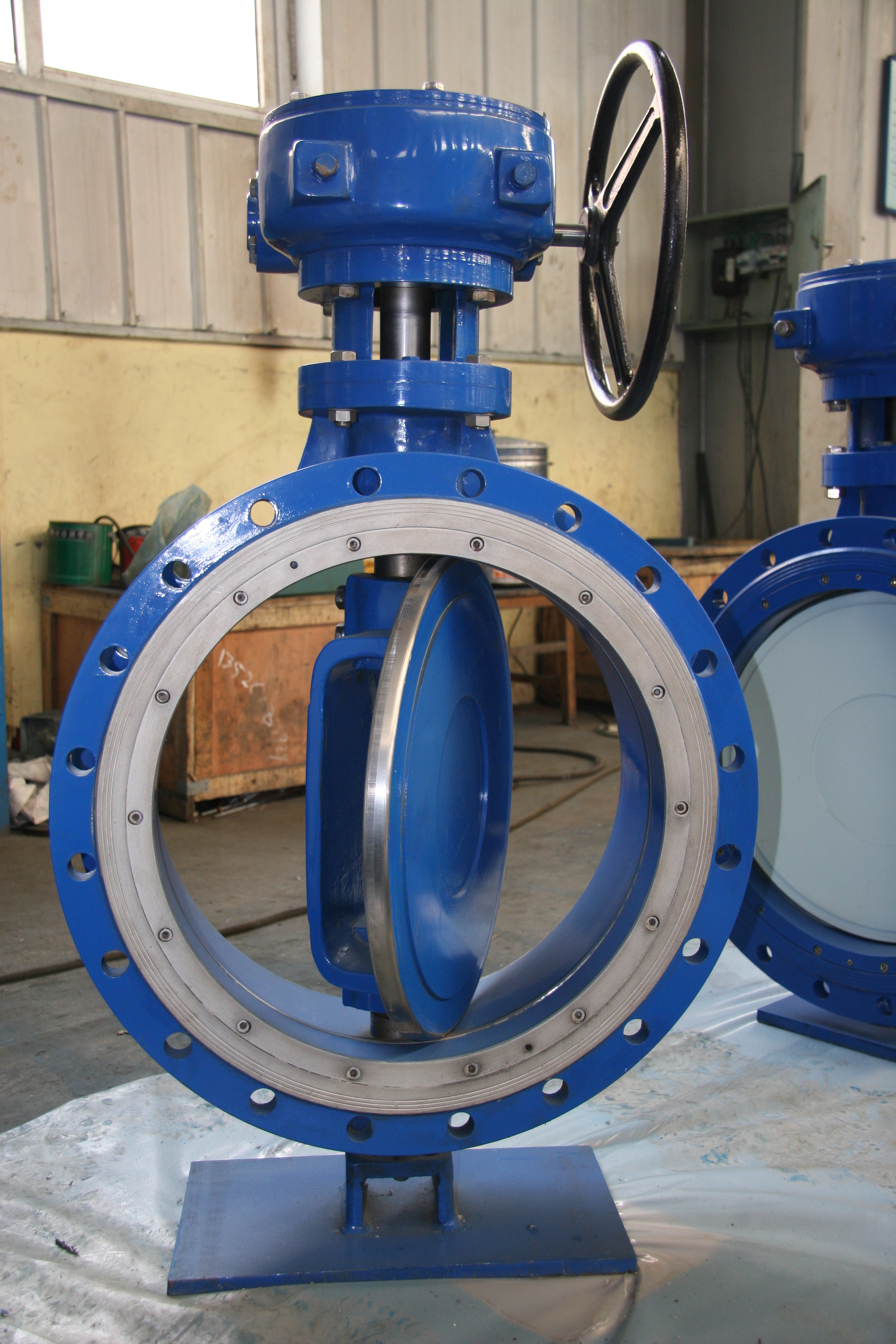
Cast iron butterfly valve

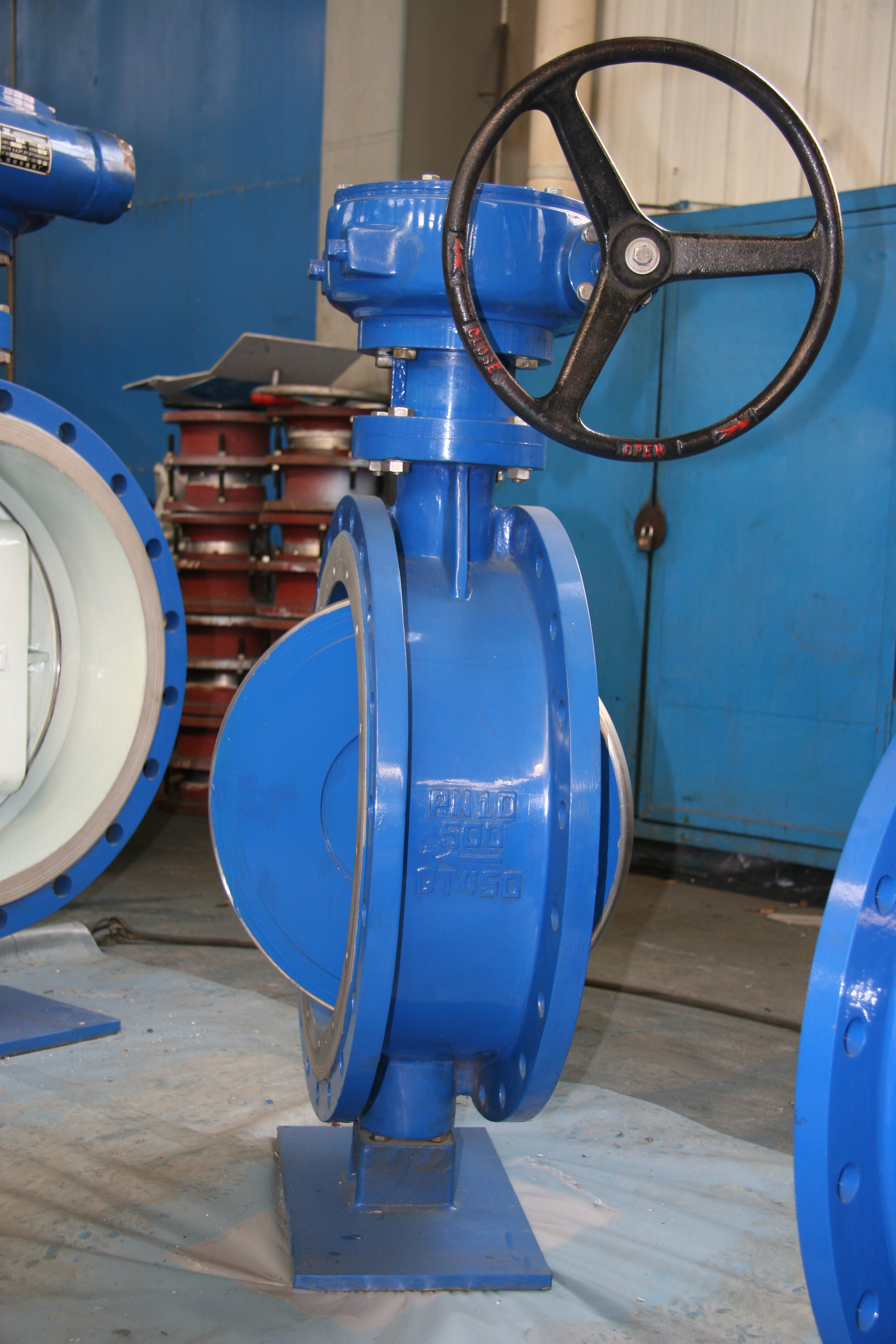
Cast iron butterfly valve

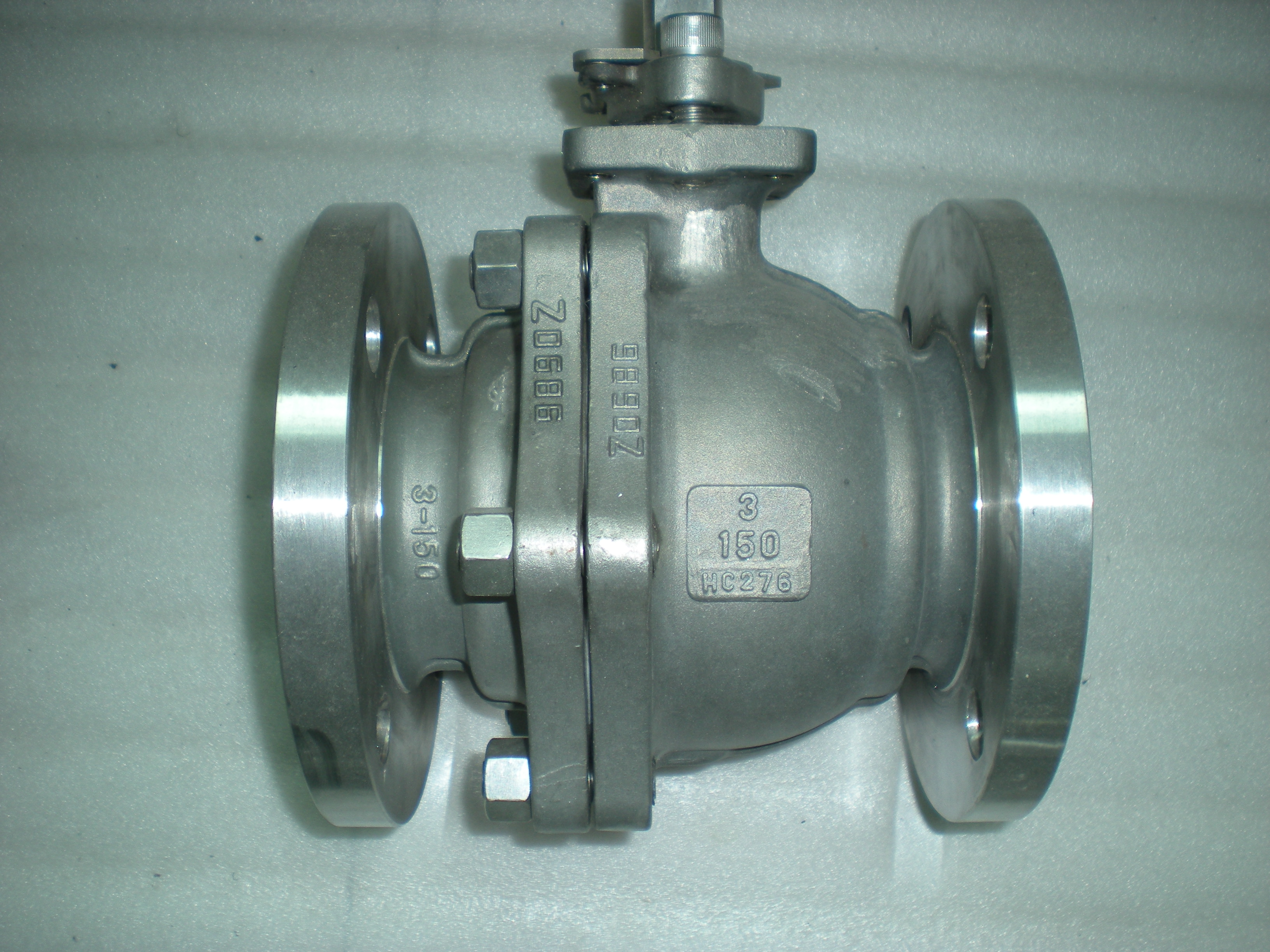
Hastelloy ball valve

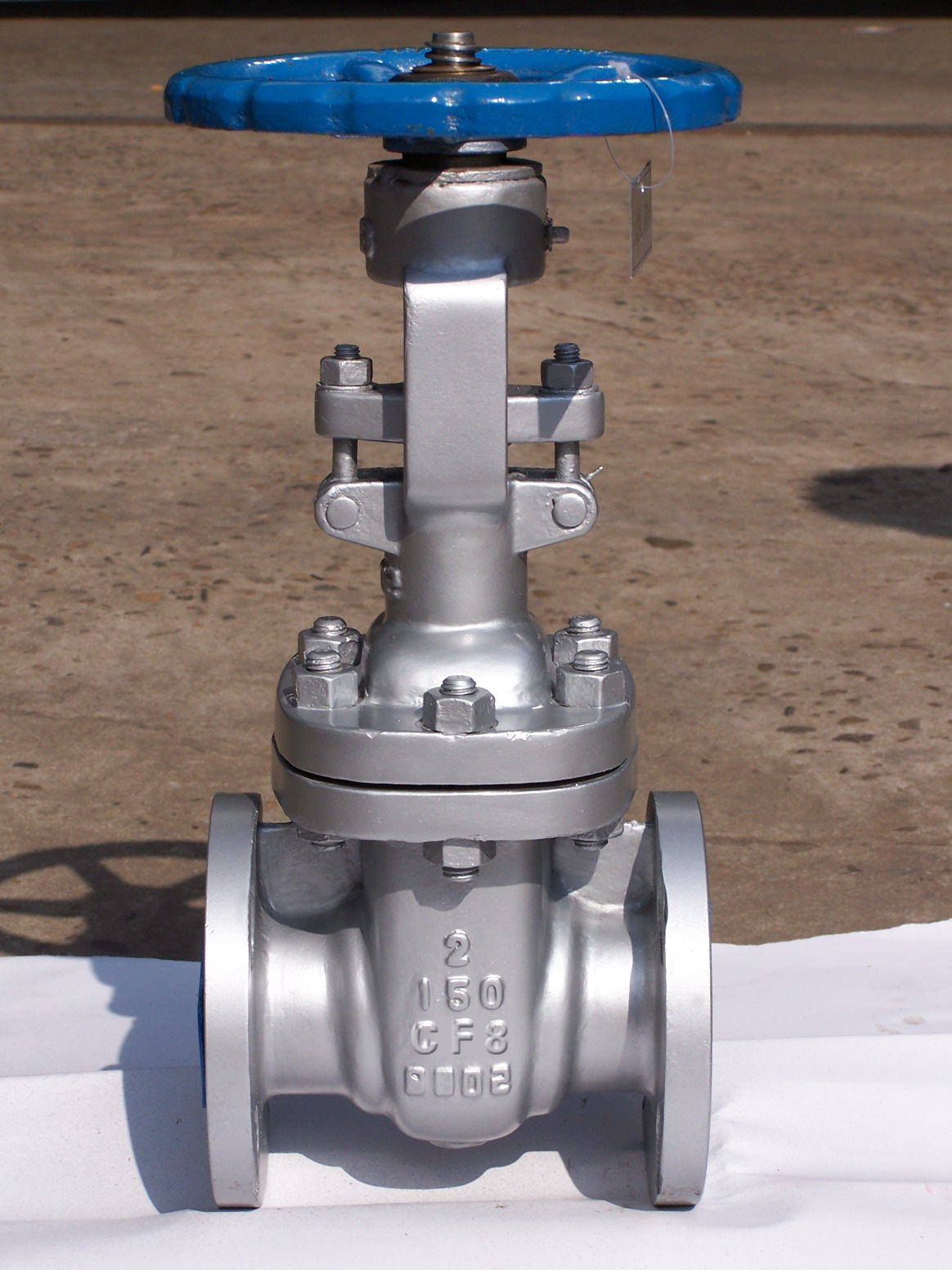
Stainless steel gate valve

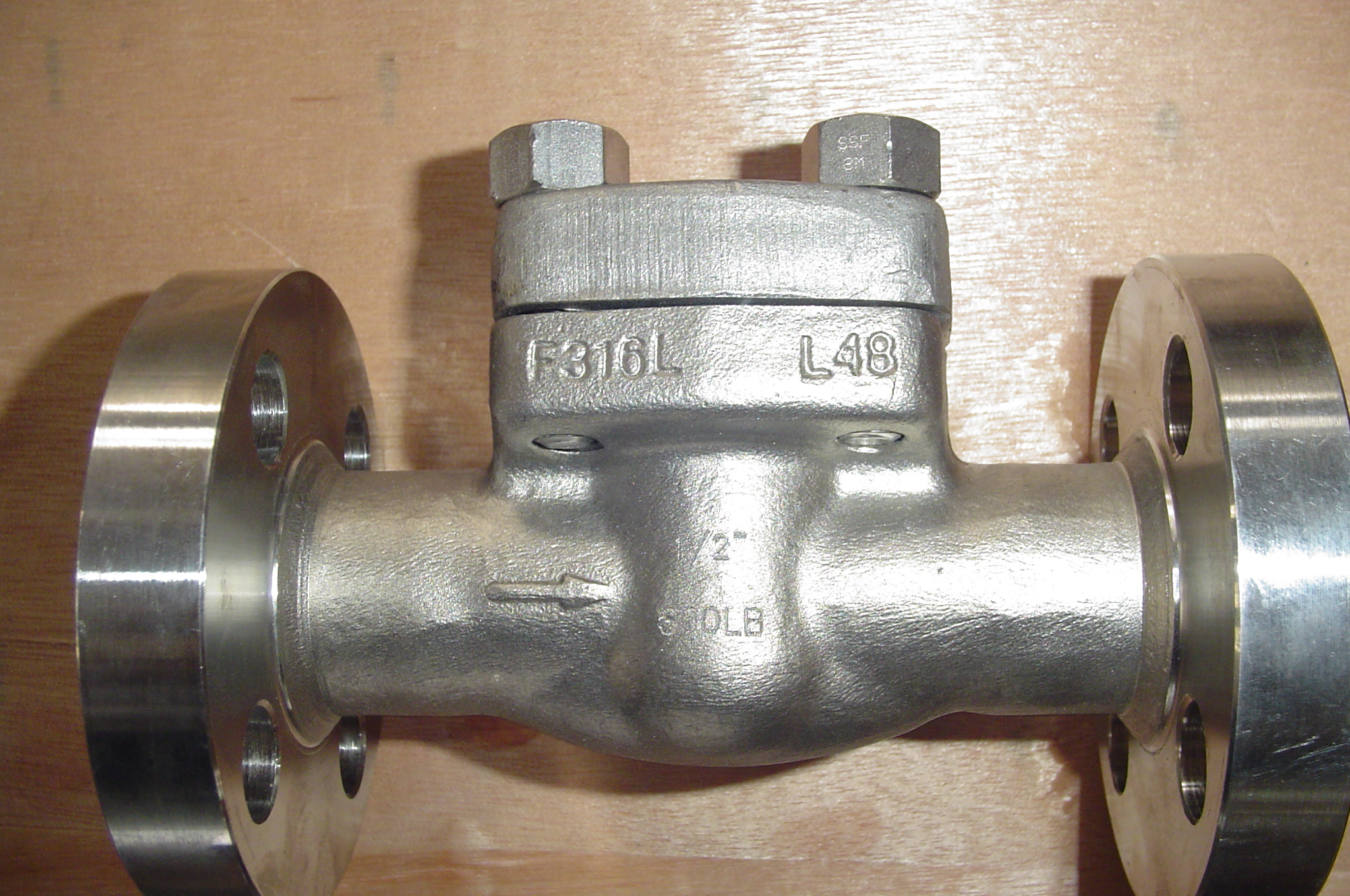
Stainless steel gate valve

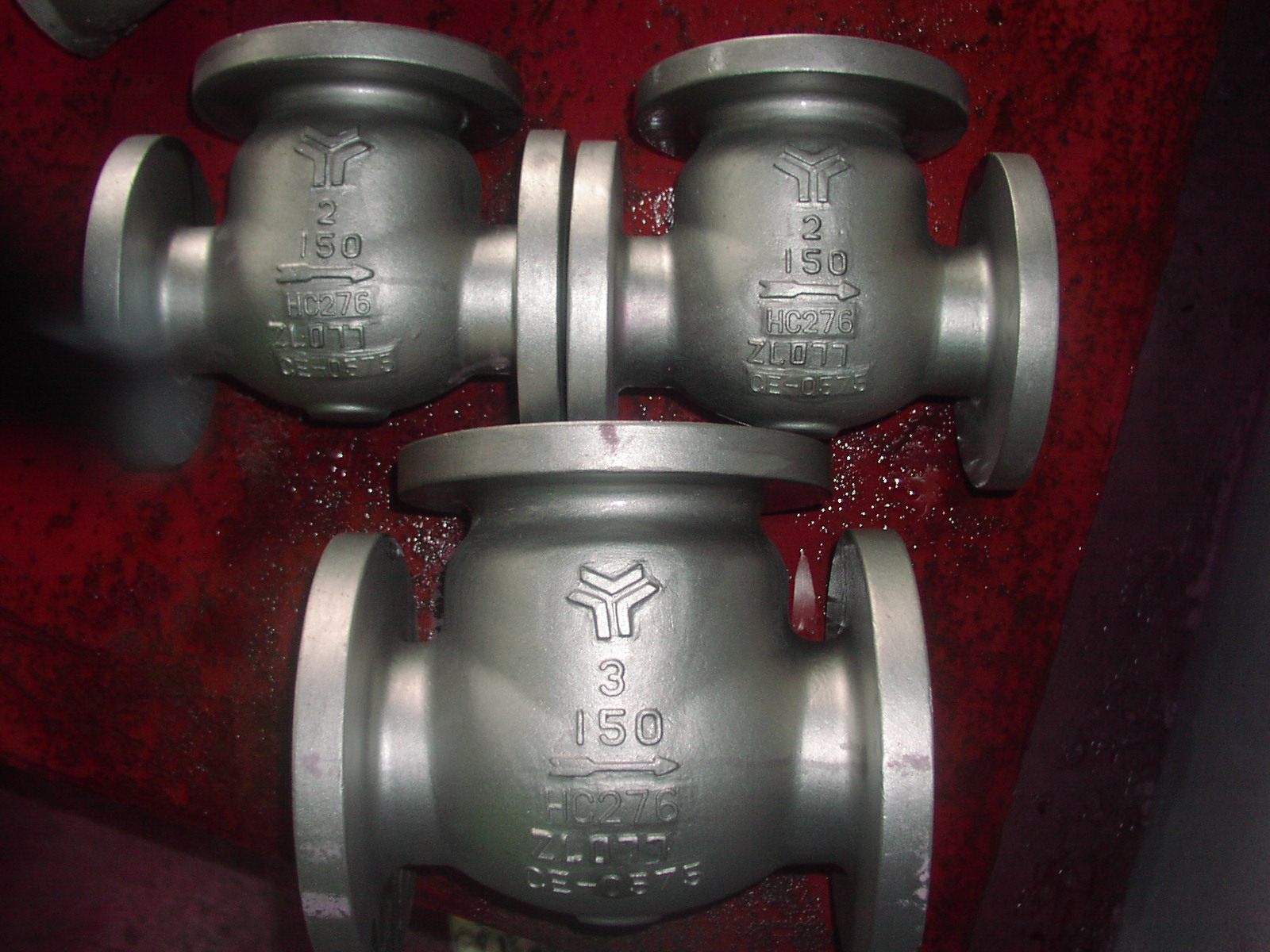
Hastelloy check valves

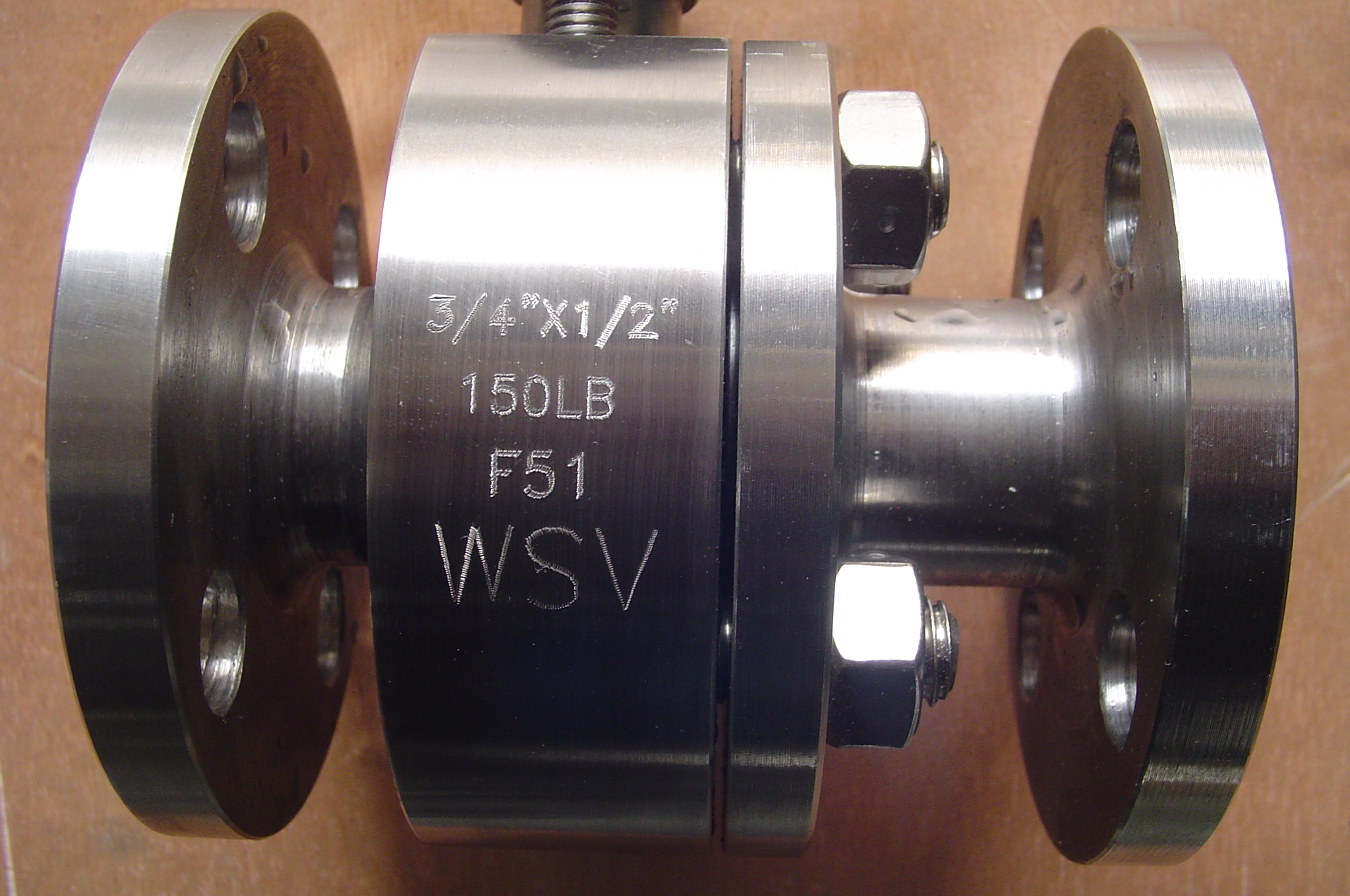
Duplex ball valve

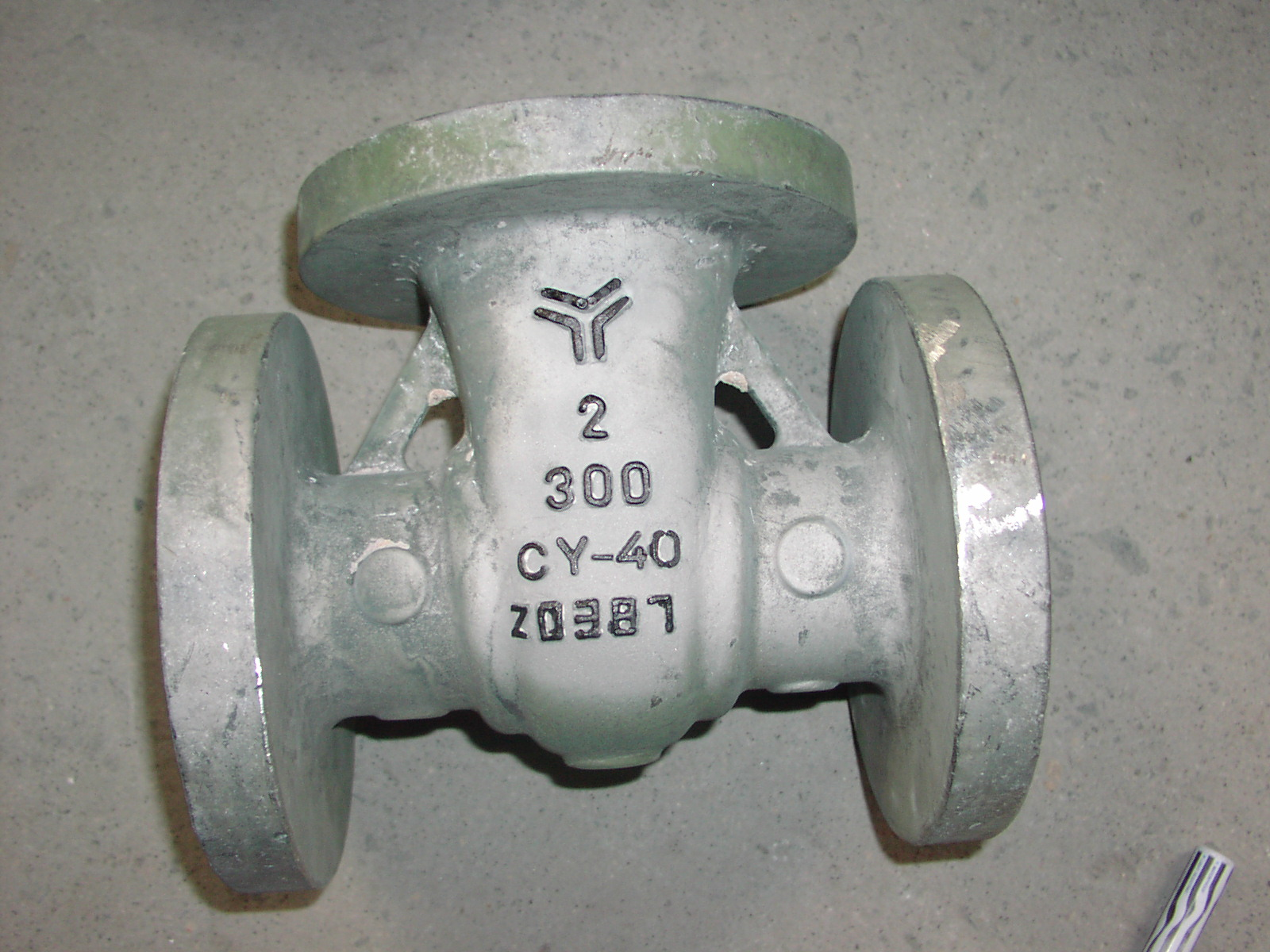
Inconel gate valve

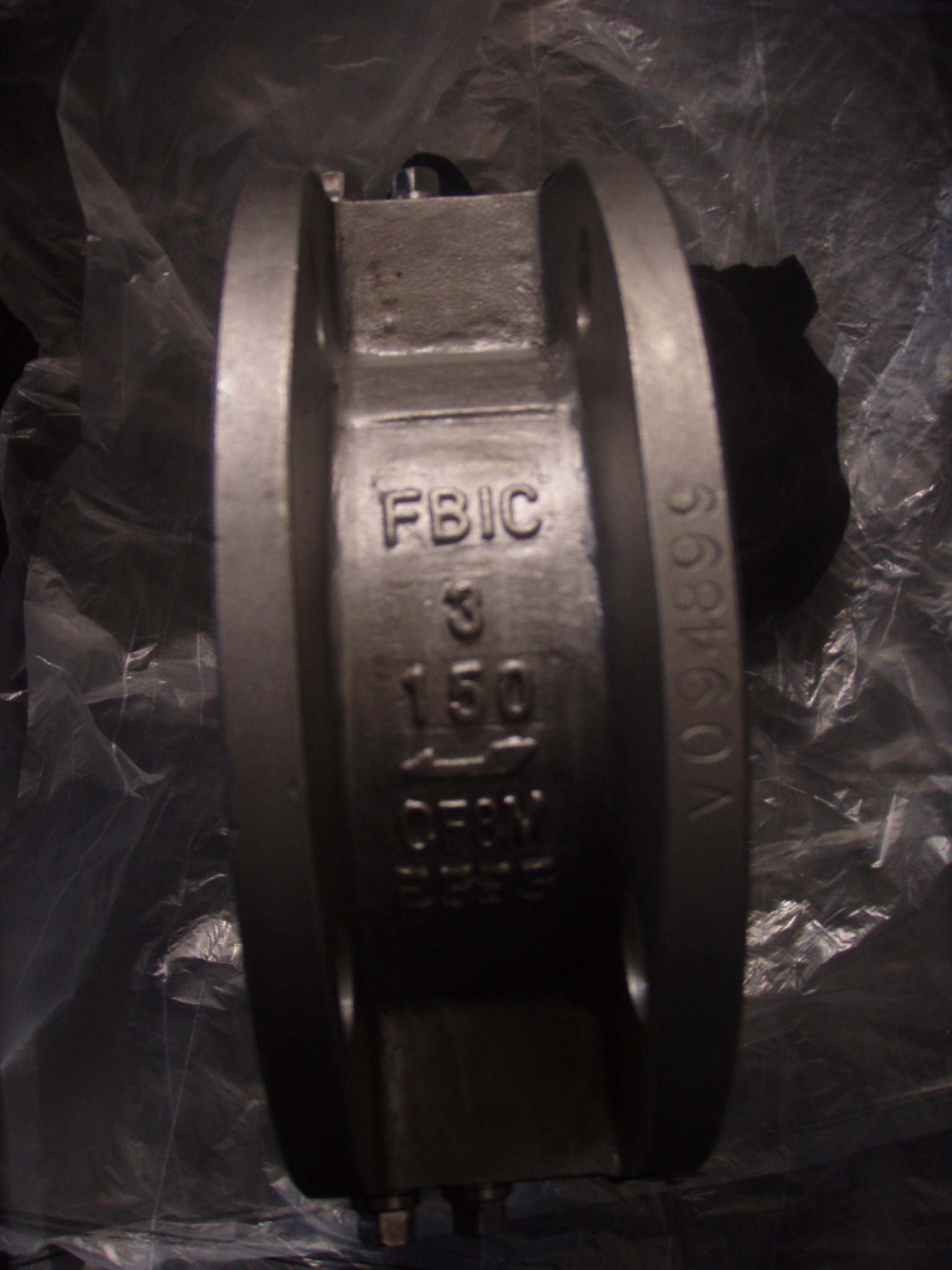
Stainless steel wafer check valve

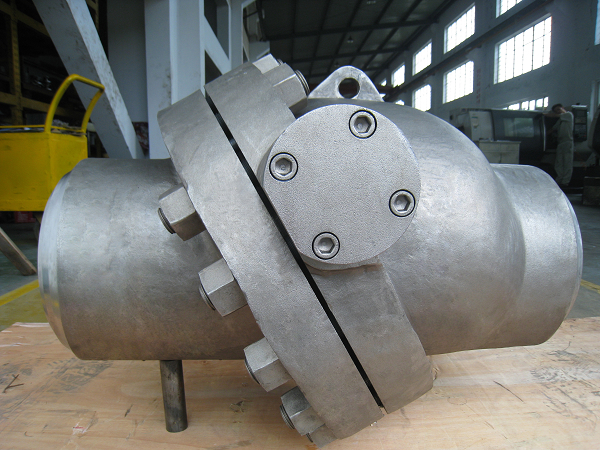
Inconel check valve

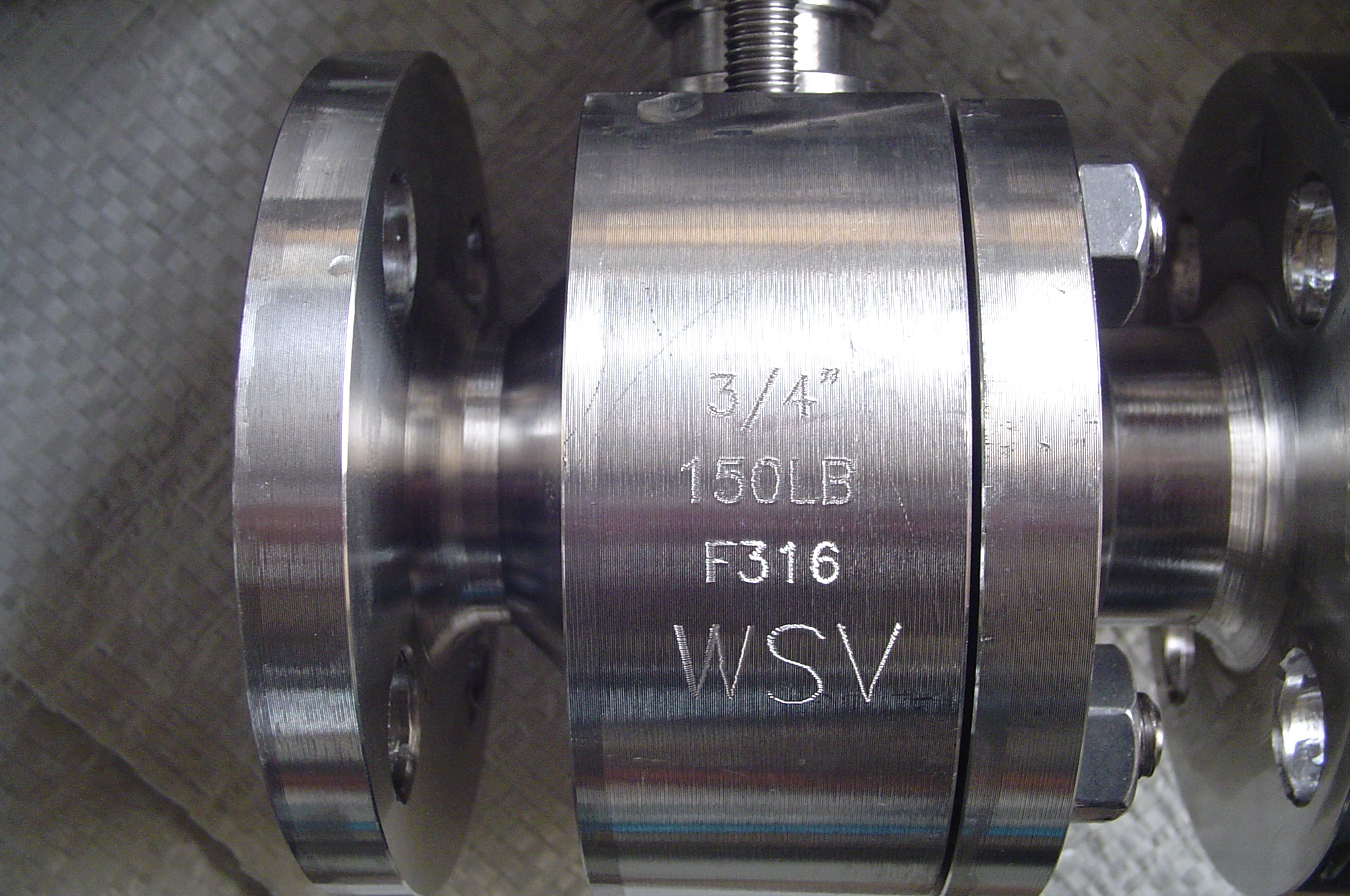
Stainless steel ball valve

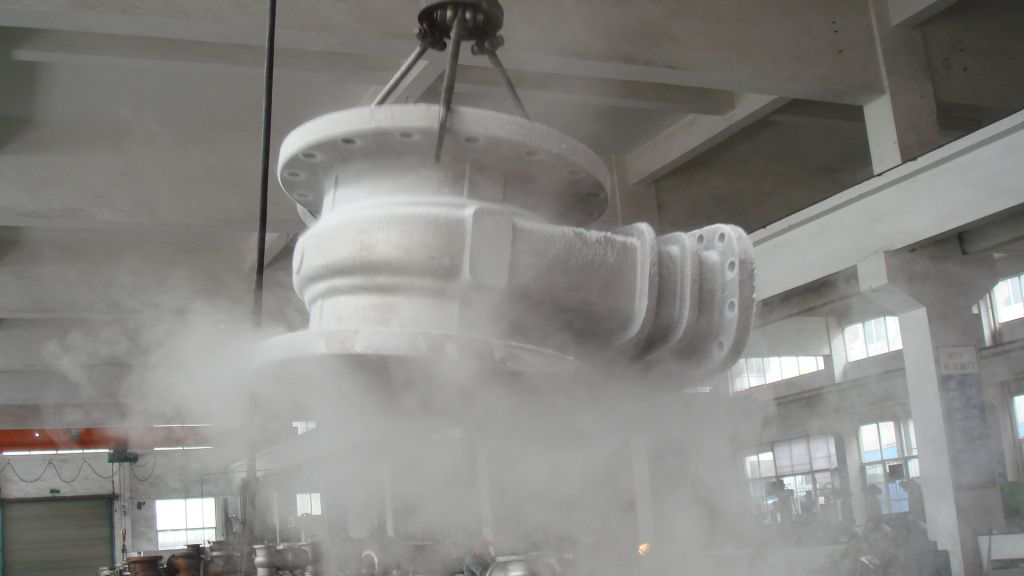
Cryogenic 254 SMO gate valve

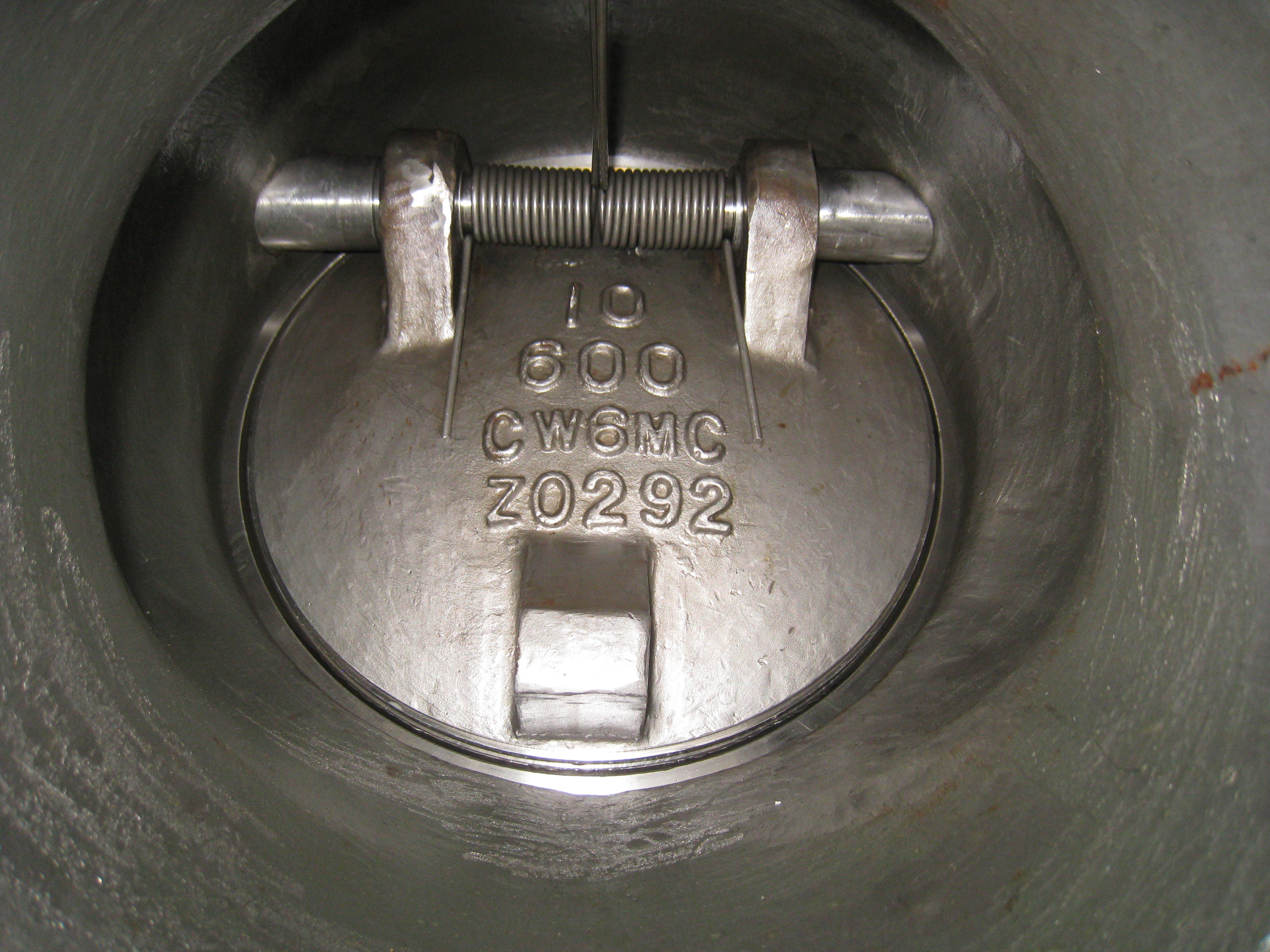
Inside view of a tilting disc inconel check valve

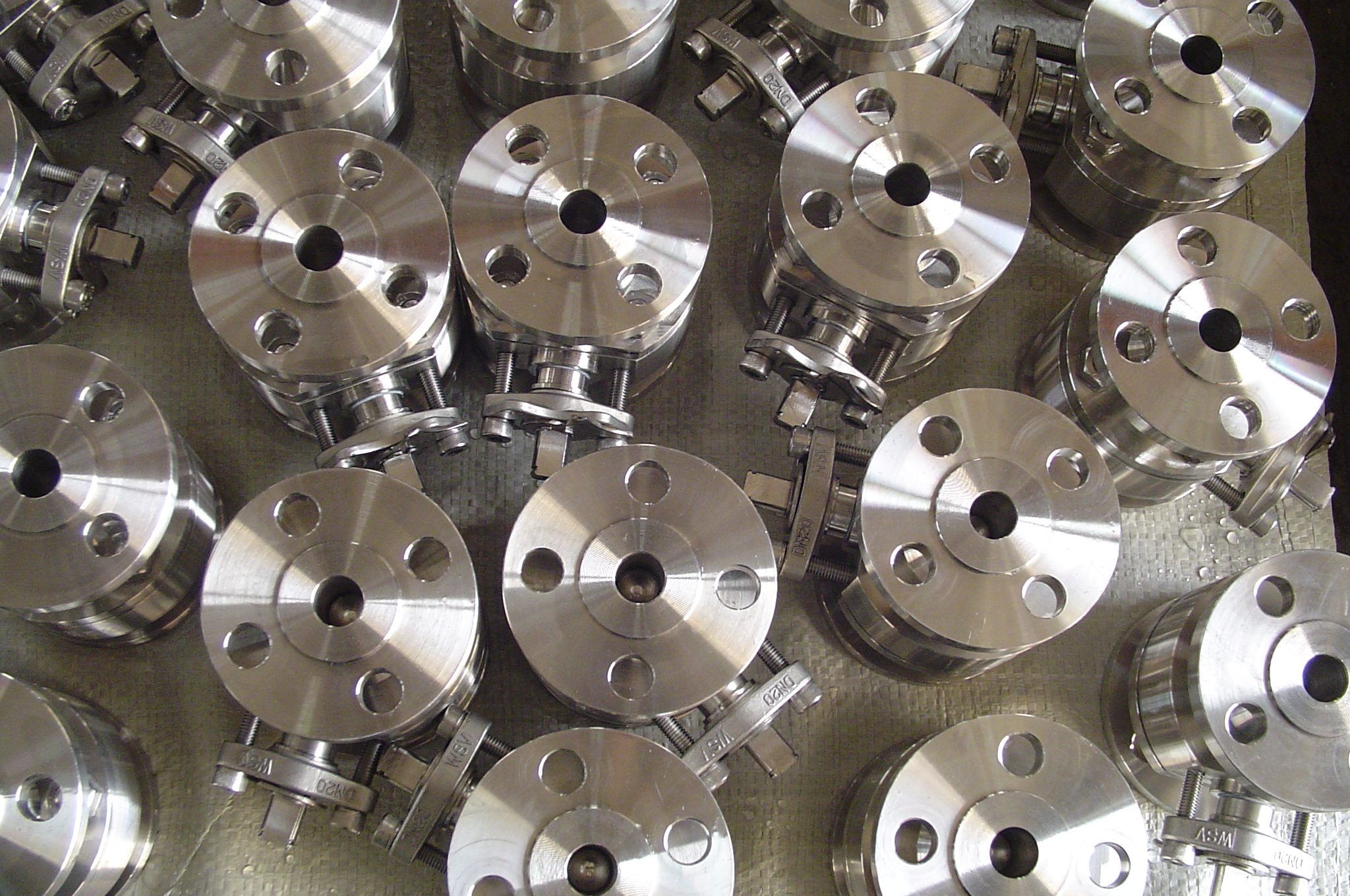
Duplex ball valves

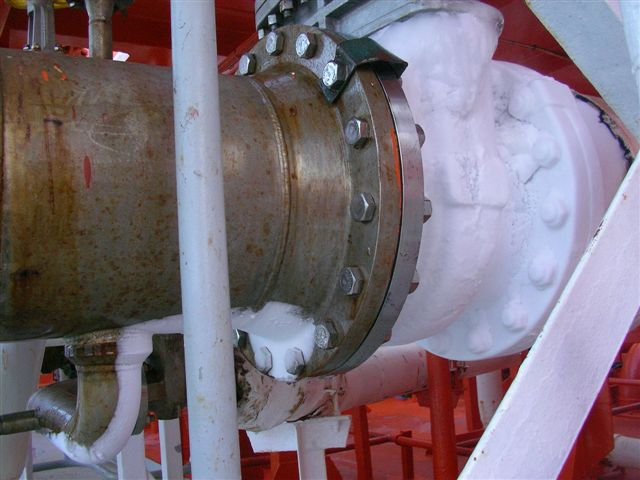
Cryogenic super duplex gate valve frozen up during operation

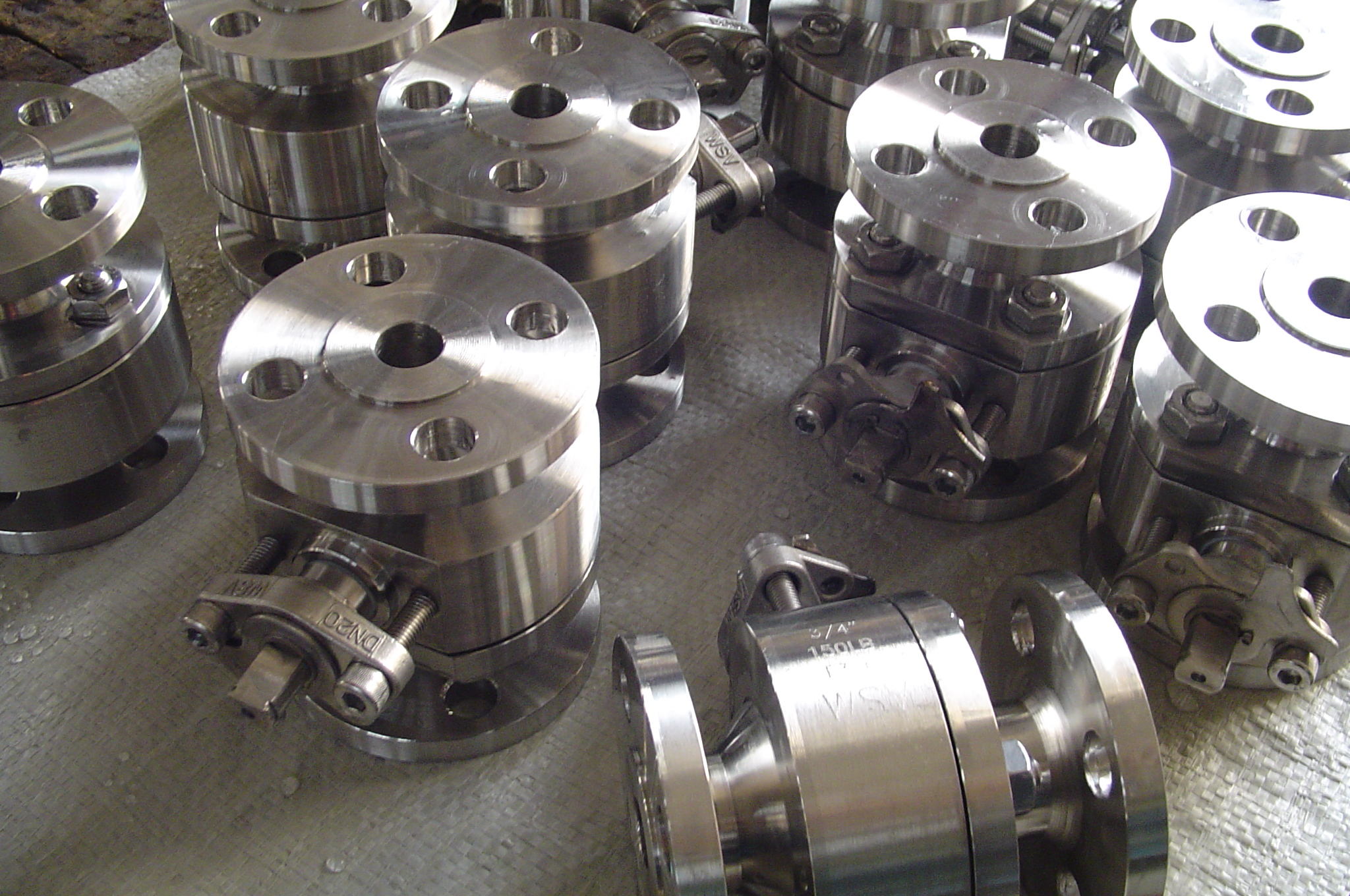
Super duplex ball valves

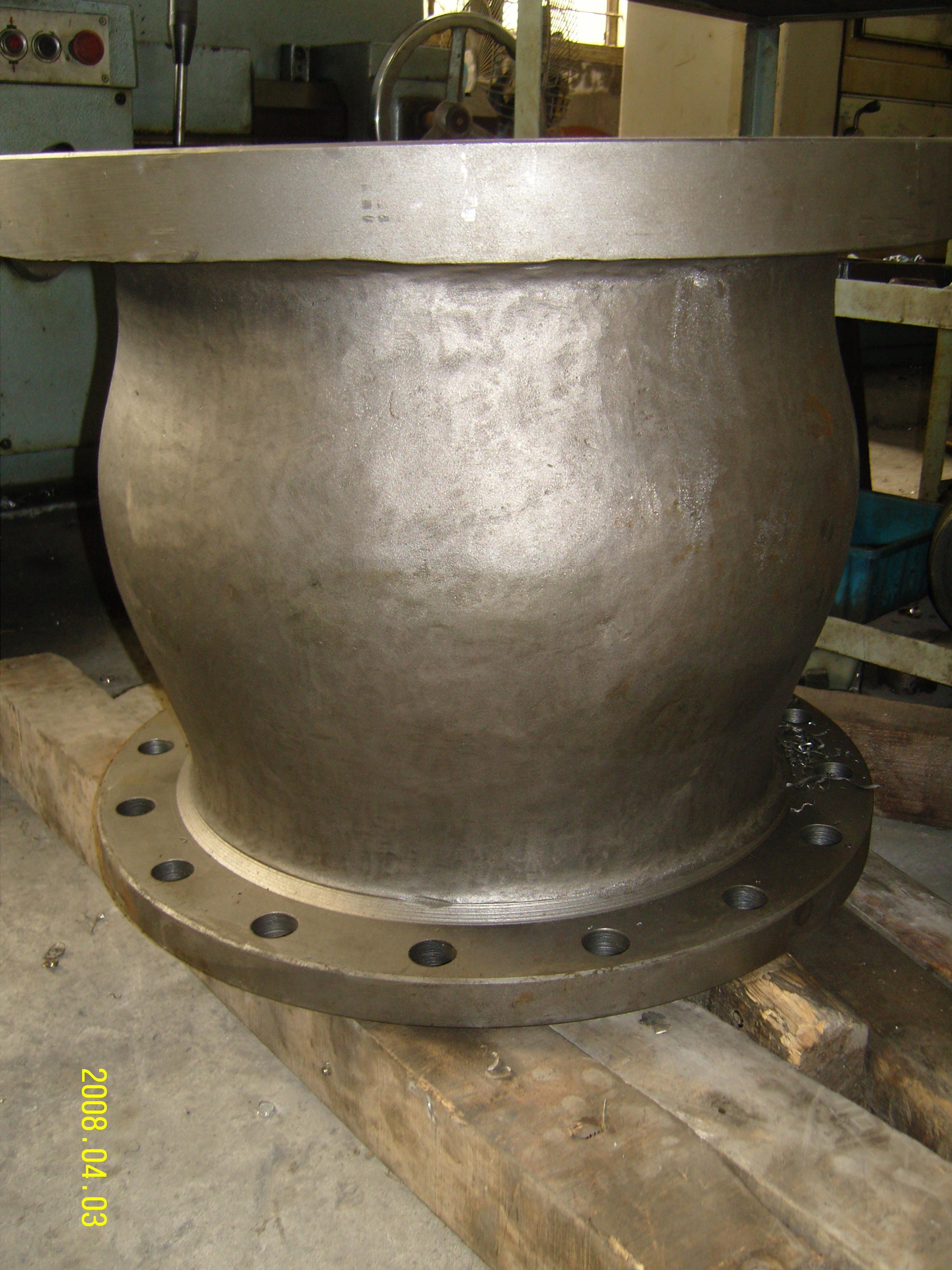
Flanged nozzle inconel check valve or axial check valve

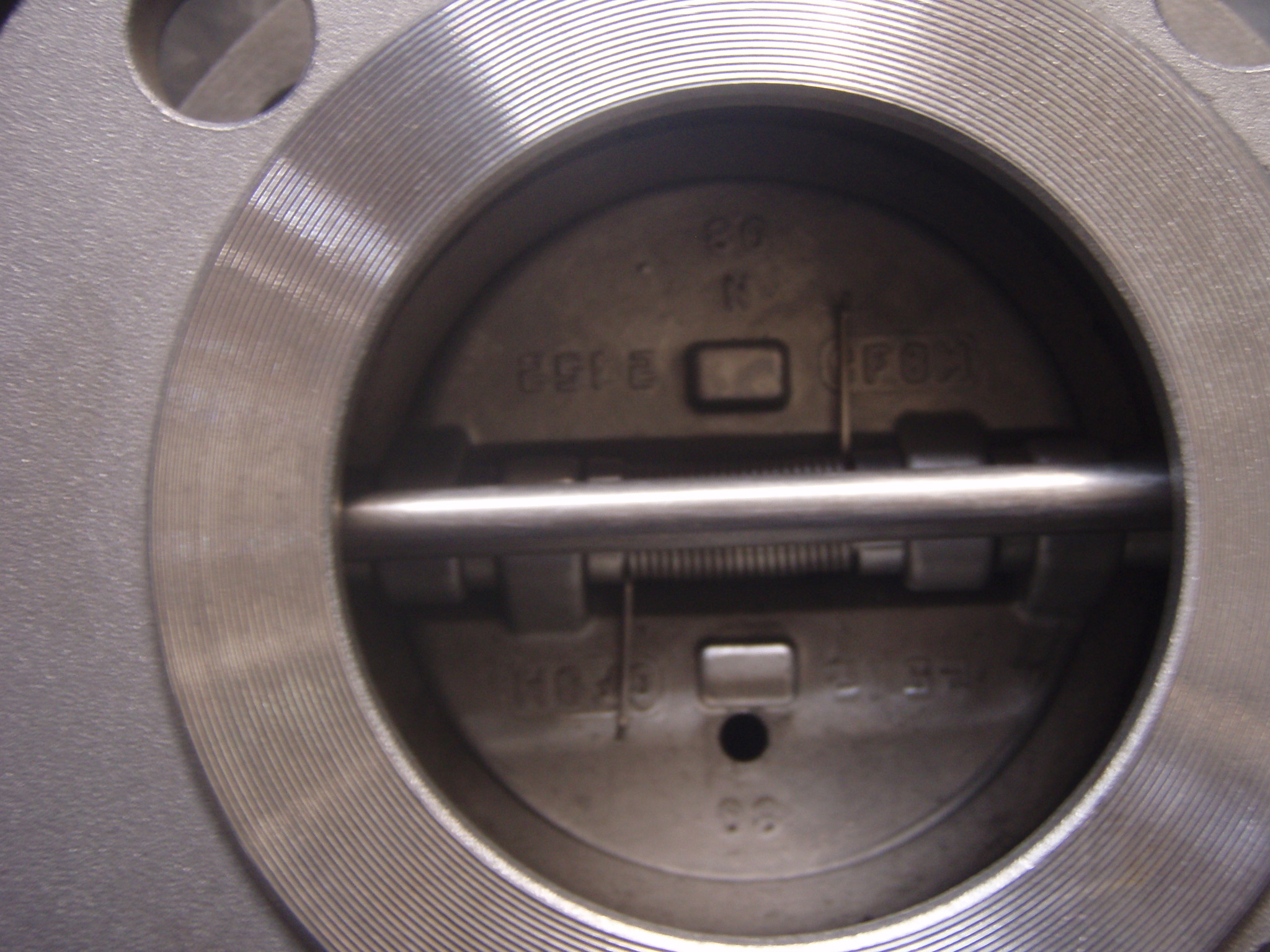
Inside hastelloy check valve, wafer configuration

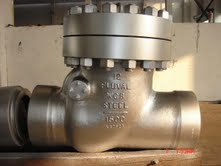
Large carbon steel swing check valve

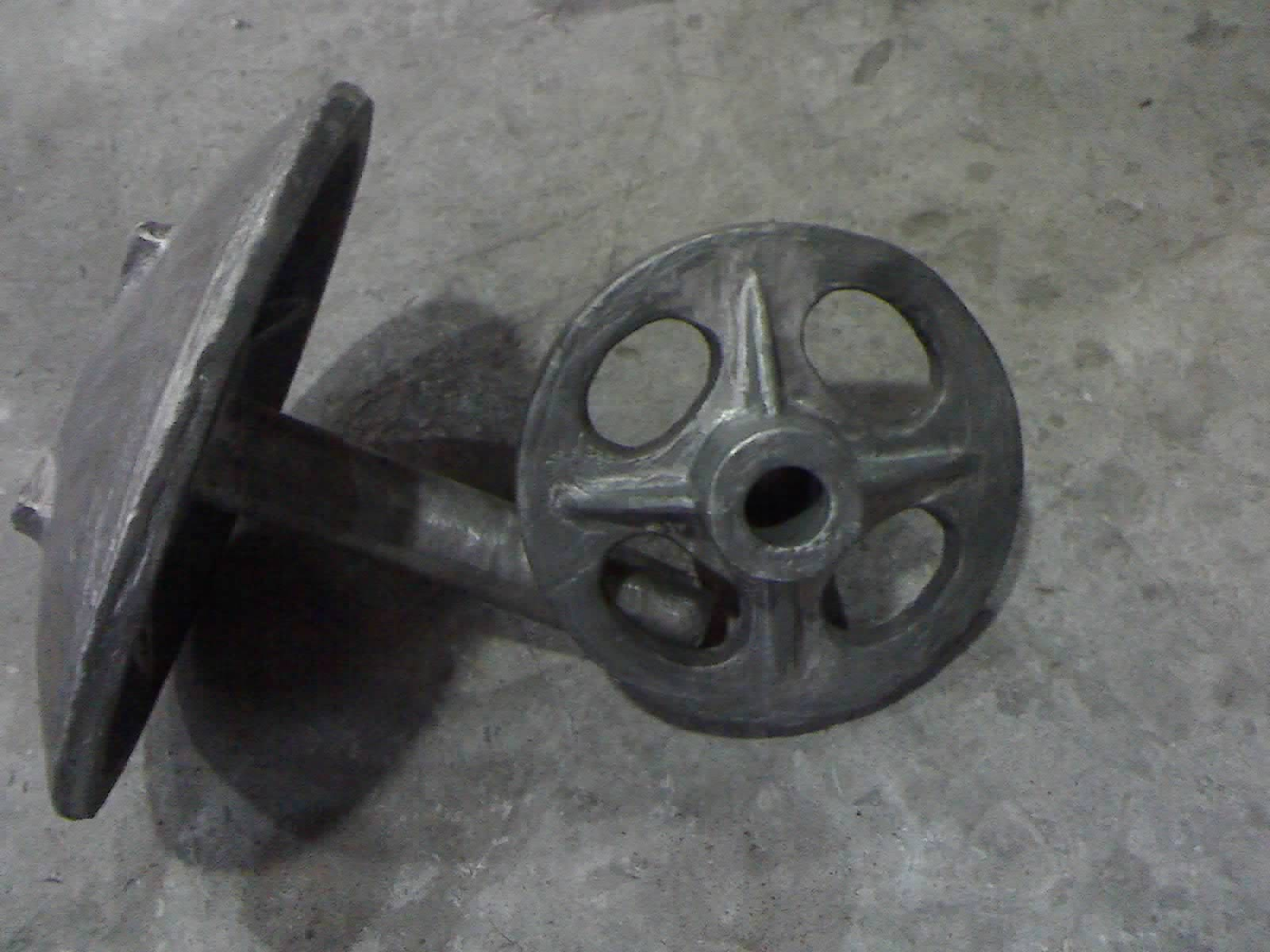
Disc for an alloy check valve also known as axial check valve

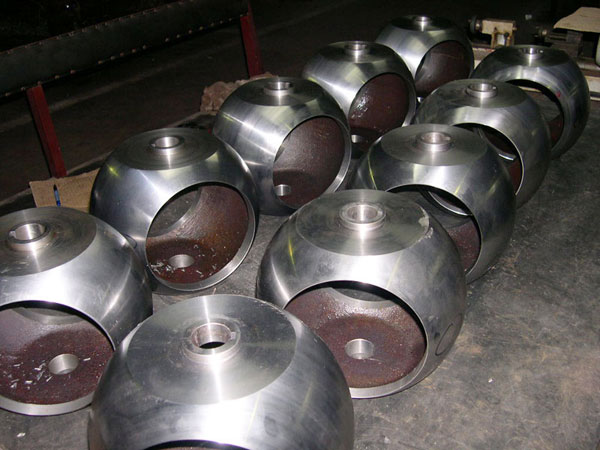
Balls for alloy ball valves

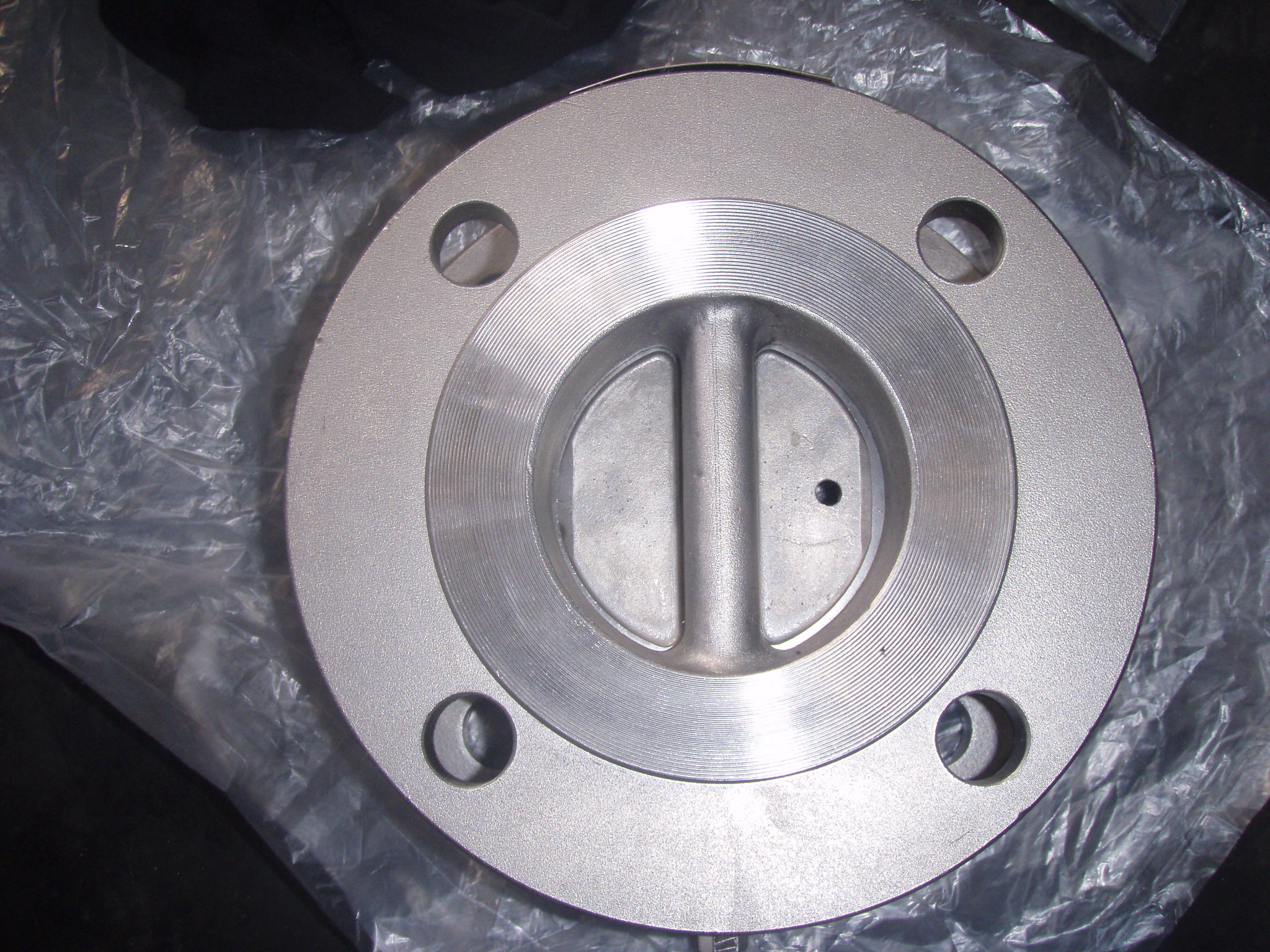
Wafer check valve

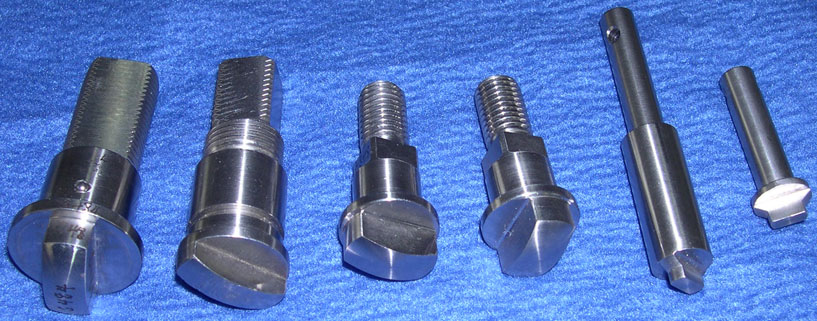
Nuts and bolts for incoloy valves

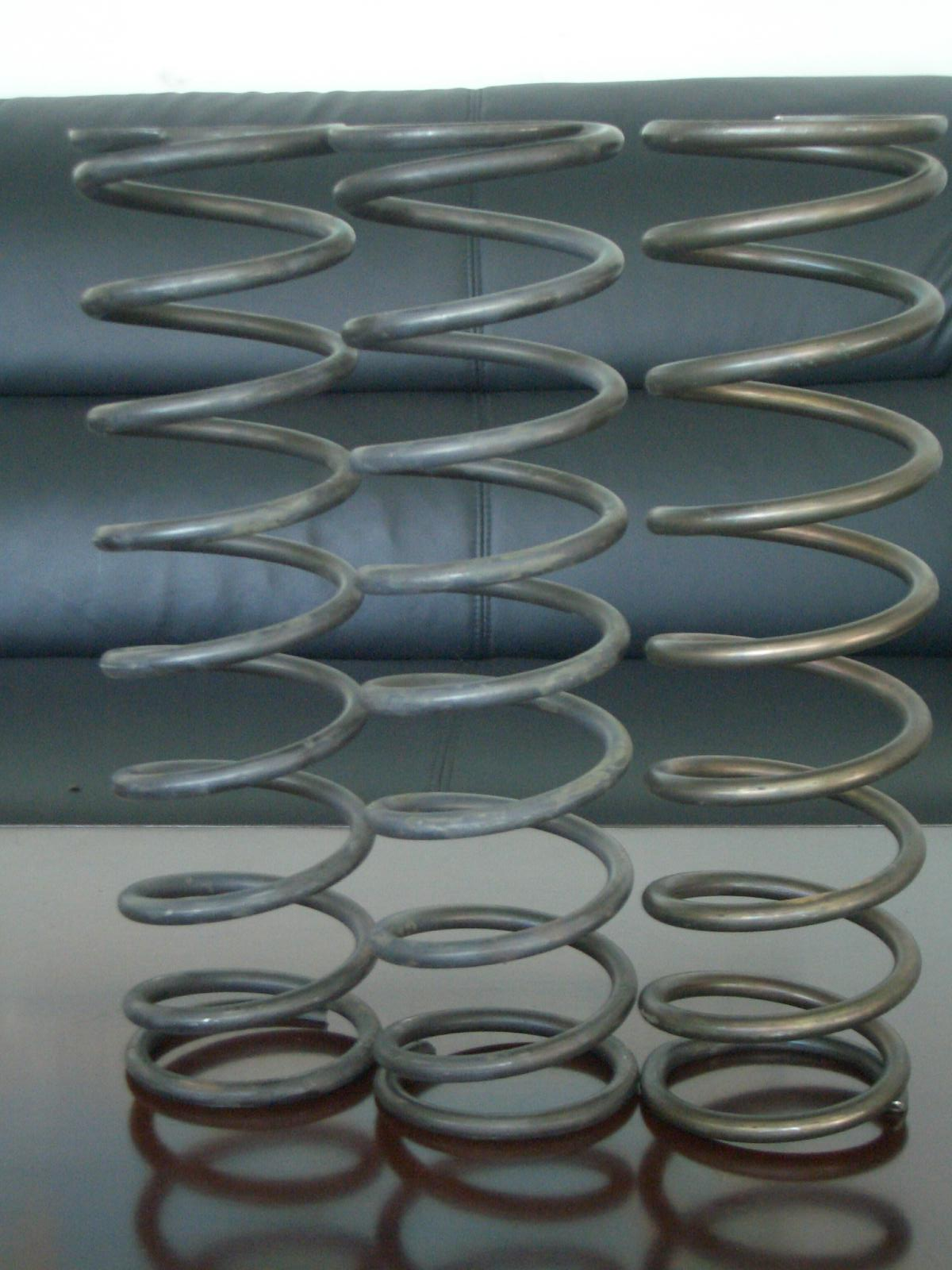
Inconel check valve springs

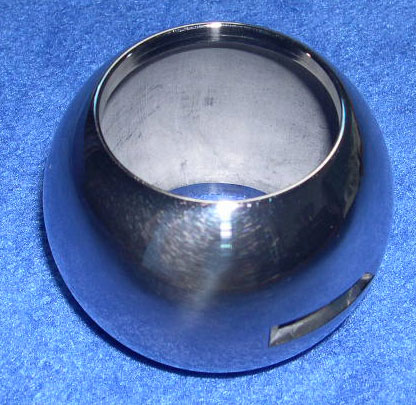
Ball for a titanium ball valve

== See also ==
- Ball valve – Flow-control device
- Ceramic valve – Valve with special ceramics
- Control valve – Flow-control device
- Cylinder valve (disambiguation)
- Endobronchial valve, medical
- Four-way valve – Flow-control device
- Hydrostatic test – Non-destructive test of pressure vessels
- Pipe – Tubular section or hollow cylinder
- Piping – System of pipes used to transport fluids
- Plastic pipework – Tubular section or hollow cylinder made of plastic
- Poppet valve – Type of valve
- Rotary valve – Valve where rotation of passages in a plug controls flow direction
- Tap (valve) – Valve controlling the release of a liquid or gas
- Tubing – Long hollow cylinder used for moving fluids
- Scuba cylinder valve – Valve controlling flow of breathing gas into and out of a scuba cylinder
- Valve exerciser – Device for maintaining flow control devices
- Valve stem – Type of valve
- Variable valve timing – Process of altering the timing of a valve lift event
- Zone valve – Type of water- of steam-flow valve
