= Valve exerciser =

Device for maintaining flow control devices

A valve exerciser is a device that operates a valve periodically in order to prevent it from becoming so stiff that it no longer works. Valves that are left in a static position for a long time may corrode or become blocked with mineral deposits. Electronic valve exercisers can provide information on the health of a valve by monitoring the required operating torque.
