= Gas meter =

Flow meter for fuel gases

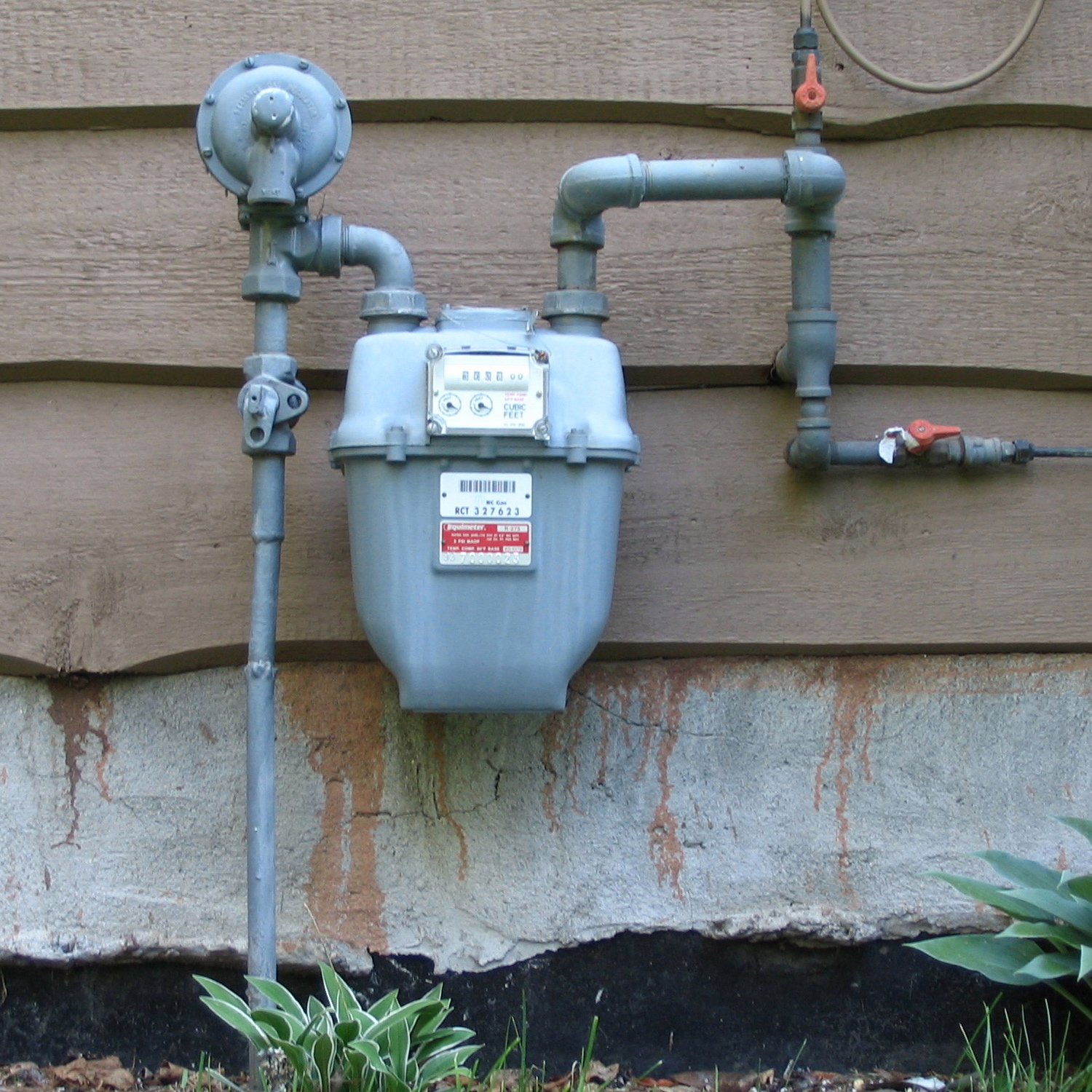
Gas meter

A gas meter is a specialized flow meter, used to measure the volume of fuel gases such as natural gas and liquefied petroleum gas. Gas meters are used at residential, commercial, and industrial buildings that consume fuel gas supplied by a gas utility. Gases are more difficult to measure than liquids, because measured volumes are highly affected by temperature and pressure. Gas meters measure a defined volume, regardless of the pressurized quantity or quality of the gas flowing through the meter. Temperature, pressure, and heating value compensation must be made to measure actual amount and value of gas moving through a meter.

Several different designs of gas meters are in common use, depending on the volumetric flow rate of gas to be measured, the range of flows anticipated, the type of gas being measured, and other factors.

Gas meters that exist in colder climates in buildings built prior to the 1970s were typically located inside the home, typically in the basement or garage. Since then, the vast majority are now placed outside though there are a few exceptions especially in older cities.

== Types of gas meters ==
=== Diaphragm/bellows meters ===
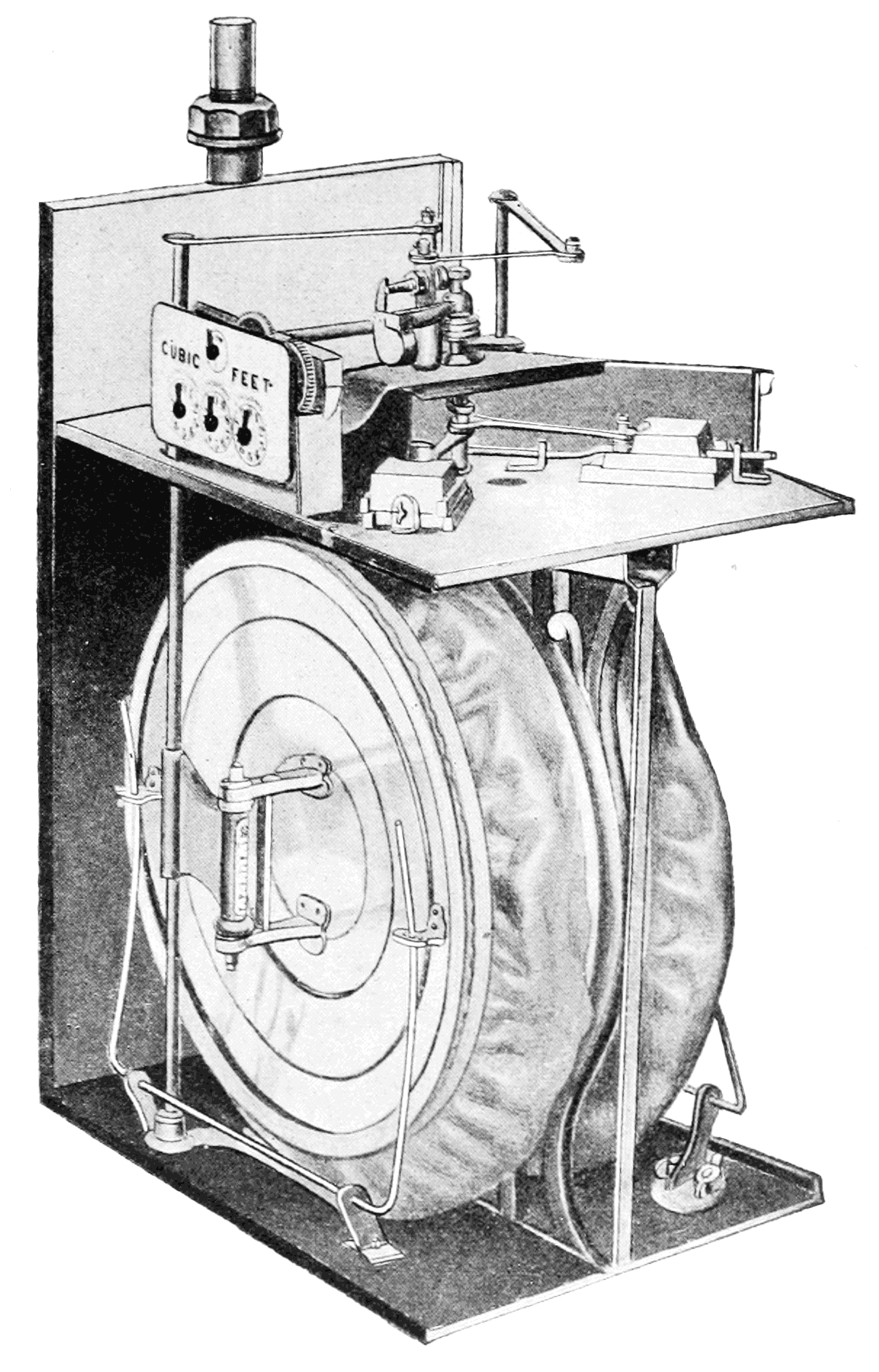
A diaphragm type gas meter, cutaway sketch from 1900

These are the most common type of gas meter, seen in almost all residential and small commercial installations. Within the meter there are two or more chambers formed by movable diaphragms. With the gas flow directed by internal valves, the chambers alternately fill and expel gas, producing a nearly continuous flow through the meter. As the diaphragms expand and contract, levers connected to cranks convert the linear motion of the diaphragms into rotary motion of a crank shaft which serves as the primary flow element. This shaft can drive an odometer-like counter mechanism or it can produce electrical pulses for a flow computer.

Diaphragm gas meters are positive displacement meters.

=== Rotary meters ===
Operating principle of a rotary gas meter

Rotary meters are highly machined precision instruments capable of handling higher volumes and pressures than diaphragm meters. Within the meter, two figure "8" shaped lobes, the rotors (also known as impellers or pistons), spin in precise alignment. With each turn, they move a specific quantity of gas through the meter. The operating principle is similar to that of a Roots blower. The rotational movement of the crank shaft serves as a primary flow element and may produce electrical pulses for a flow computer or may drive an odometer-like counter.

=== Turbine meters ===
Turbine gas meters infer gas volume by determining the speed of the gas moving through the meter. Because the volume of gas is inferred from the flow, it is important that flow conditions are good. A small internal turbine measures the speed of the gas, which is transmitted mechanically to a mechanical or electronic counter. These meters do not impede the flow of gas, but are limited at measuring lower flow rates.

=== Orifice meters ===
An orifice gas meter consists of a straight length of pipe inside which a precisely known orifice plate creates a pressure drop, thereby affecting flow. Orifice meters are a type of differential meter, all of which infer the rate of gas flow by measuring the pressure difference across a deliberately designed and installed flow disturbance. The gas static pressure, density, viscosity, and temperature must be measured or known in addition to the differential pressure for the meter to accurately measure the fluid. Orifice meters often do not handle a large range of flow rates. They are however accepted and understood in industrial applications since they are easy to field-service and have no moving parts.

=== Ultrasonic flow meters ===
Ultrasonic flow meters are more complex than meters that are purely mechanical, as they require significant signal processing and computation capabilities. Ultrasonic meters measure the speed of gas movement by measuring the speed at which sound travels in the gaseous medium within the pipe. The American Gas Association covers the proper usage and installation of these meters, and it specifies a standardised speed-of-sound calculation which predicts the speed of sound in a gas with a known pressure, temperature, and composition.

The most elaborate types of ultrasonic flow meters average speed of sound over multiple paths in the pipe. The length of each path is precisely measured in the factory. Each path consists of an ultrasonic transducer at one end and a sensor at the other. The meter creates a 'ping' with the transducer and measures the time elapsed before the sensor receives the sonic pulse. Some of these paths point upstream so that the sum of the times of flight of the sonic pulses can be divided by the sum of the flight lengths to provide an average speed of sound in the upstream direction. This speed differs from the speed of sound in the gas by the velocity at which the gas is moving in the pipe. The other paths may be identical or similar, except that the sound pulses travel downstream. The meter then compares the difference between the upstream and downstream speeds to calculate the velocity of gas flow.

Ultrasonic meters are high-cost and work best with no liquids present at all in the measured gas, so they are primarily used in high-flow, high-pressure applications such as utility pipeline meter stations, where the gas is always dry and lean, and where small proportional inaccuracies are intolerable due to the large amount of money at stake. The turndown ratio of an ultrasonic meter is probably the largest of any natural gas meter type, and the accuracy and range ability of a high-quality ultrasonic meter is actually greater than that of the turbine meters against which they are proven.

Inexpensive varieties of ultrasonic meters are available as clamp-on flow meters, which can be used to measure flow in any diameter of pipe without intrusive modification. Such devices are based on two types of technology: (1) time of flight or transit time; and (2) cross correlation. Both technologies involve transducers that are simply clamped on to the pipe and programmed with the pipe size and schedule and can be used to calculate flow. Such meters can be used to measure almost any dry gas including natural gas, nitrogen, compressed air, and steam. Clamp-on meters are available for measuring liquid flow as well.

=== Coriolis meters ===
A coriolis meter is usually one or more pipes with longitudinally or axially displaced section(s) that are excited to vibrate at resonant frequency. Coriolis meters are used with liquids and gases. When the fluid within the displaced section is at rest, both the upstream and downstream portion of the displaced section will vibrate in phase with each other. The frequency of this vibration is determined by the overall density of the pipe (including its contents). This allows the meter to measure the flowing density of the gas in real time. Once the fluid begins to flow, however, the Coriolis force comes into play. This effect implies a relationship between the phase difference in the vibration of the upstream and downstream sections and the mass flow rate of the fluid contained by the pipe.

Again, owing to the amount of inference, analog control and calculation intrinsic to a coriolis meter, the meter is not complete with just its physical components. There are actuation, sensing, electronic, and computational elements that must be present for the meter to function.

Coriolis meters can handle a wide range of flow rates and have the unique ability to output mass flow - this gives the highest accuracy of flow measurement currently available for mass flow measurement. Since they measure flowing density, coriolis meters can also infer gas flow rate at flowing conditions.

American Gas Association Report No. 11 provides guidelines for obtaining good results when measuring natural gas with a coriolis meter.

=== Thermal Mass Flow meter ===
Thermal mass flow meter are a pivotal innovation in gas metering technology, leveraging heat transfer principles to accurately measure gas flow rates. These sensors operate by introducing a small amount of heat into the gas stream and measuring the temperature change downstream. The rate of heat dissipation correlates directly to the mass flow rate of the gas, providing precise measurements even at low flow rates.

Thermal flow sensors are particularly advantageous for gas meters due to their:

- High Accuracy: Suitable for applications requiring precise billing or industrial gas flow monitoring.
- Wide Flow Range: Capable of measuring both low and high flow rates without sacrificing performance.
- Compact Design: Ideal for integration into modern, space-saving smart gas meters.

Minimal Maintenance: No moving parts reduce wear and tear, leading to long-term reliability.

These sensors are commonly paired with temperature and pressure compensation systems to account for variations in gas properties, ensuring accurate measurement across varying environmental conditions. Thermal sensors are also integral to advanced smart meters, enabling real-time data transmission and analytics for utilities and end-users.

Recent innovations in thermal sensor technology include microelectromechanical systems (MEMS)-based sensors, which offer further miniaturization, enhanced sensitivity, and lower power consumption, making them ideal for IoT-enabled gas metering systems.

== Heating value ==
The volume of gas flow provided by a gas meter is just that, a reading of volume. Gas volume does not take into account the quality of the gas or the amount of heat available when burned. Utility customers are billed according to the heat available in the gas. The quality of the gas is measured and adjusted for in each billing cycle. This is known by several names as the calorific value, heating value, or therm value.

The calorific value of natural gas can be obtained using a process gas chromatograph, which measures the amount of each constituent of the gas, namely:

- methane
- ethane
- hydrogen
- carbon monoxide
- water vapour

Additionally, to convert from volume to thermal energy, the pressure and temperature of the gas must be taken into consideration. Pressure is generally not a problem; the meter is simply installed immediately downstream of a pressure regulator and is calibrated to read accurately at that pressure. Pressure compensation then occurs in the utility's billing system. Varying temperature cannot be handled as easily, but some meters are designed with built-in temperature compensation to keep them reasonably accurate over their designed temperature range. Others are corrected for temperature electronically.

== Indicating devices ==
Any type of gas meter can be obtained with a wide variety of indicators. The most common are indicators that use multiple clock hands (pointer style) or digital readouts similar to an odometer, but remote readouts of various types are also becoming popular — see Automatic meter reading and Smart meter.

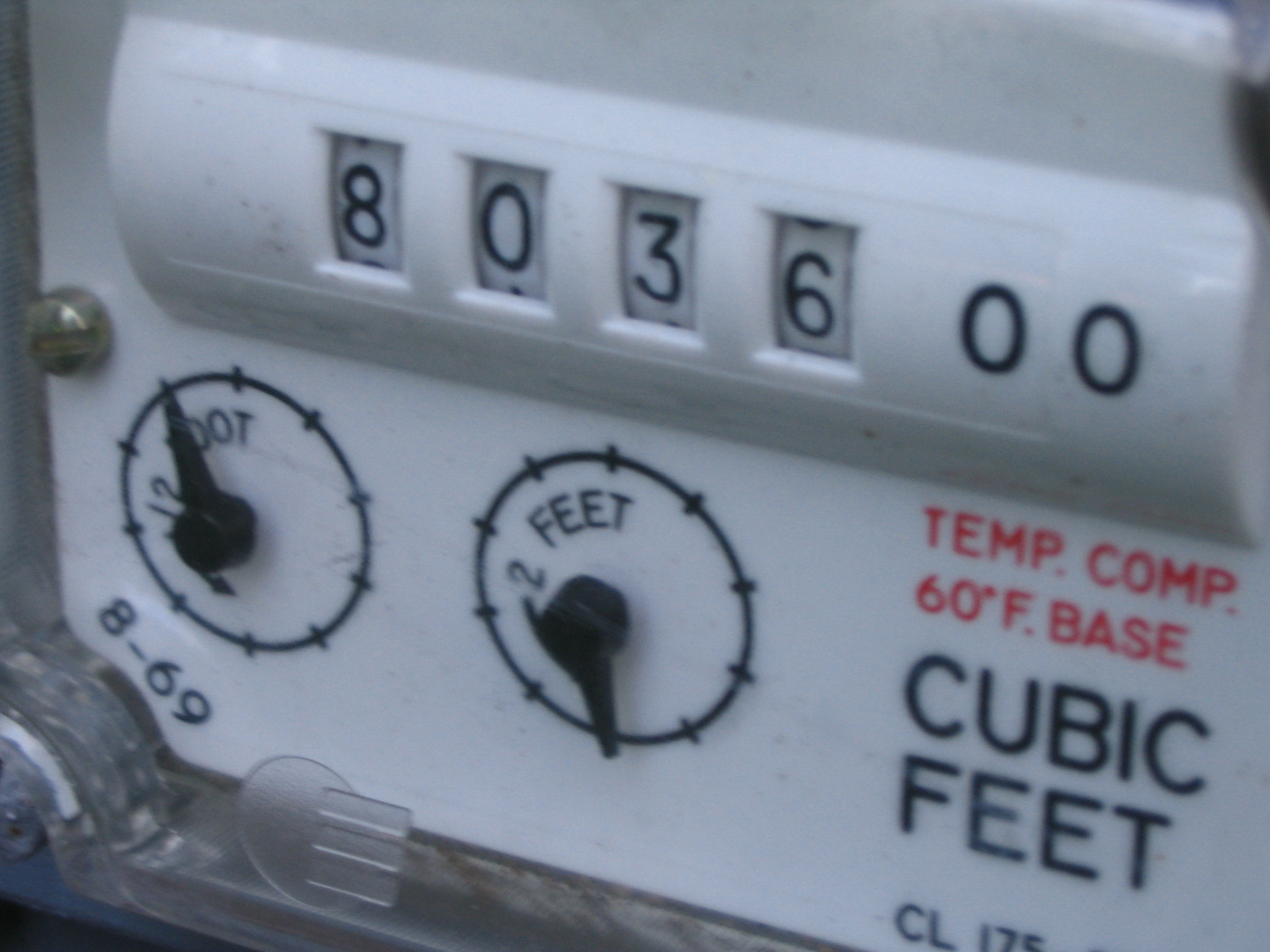
Digital indicator

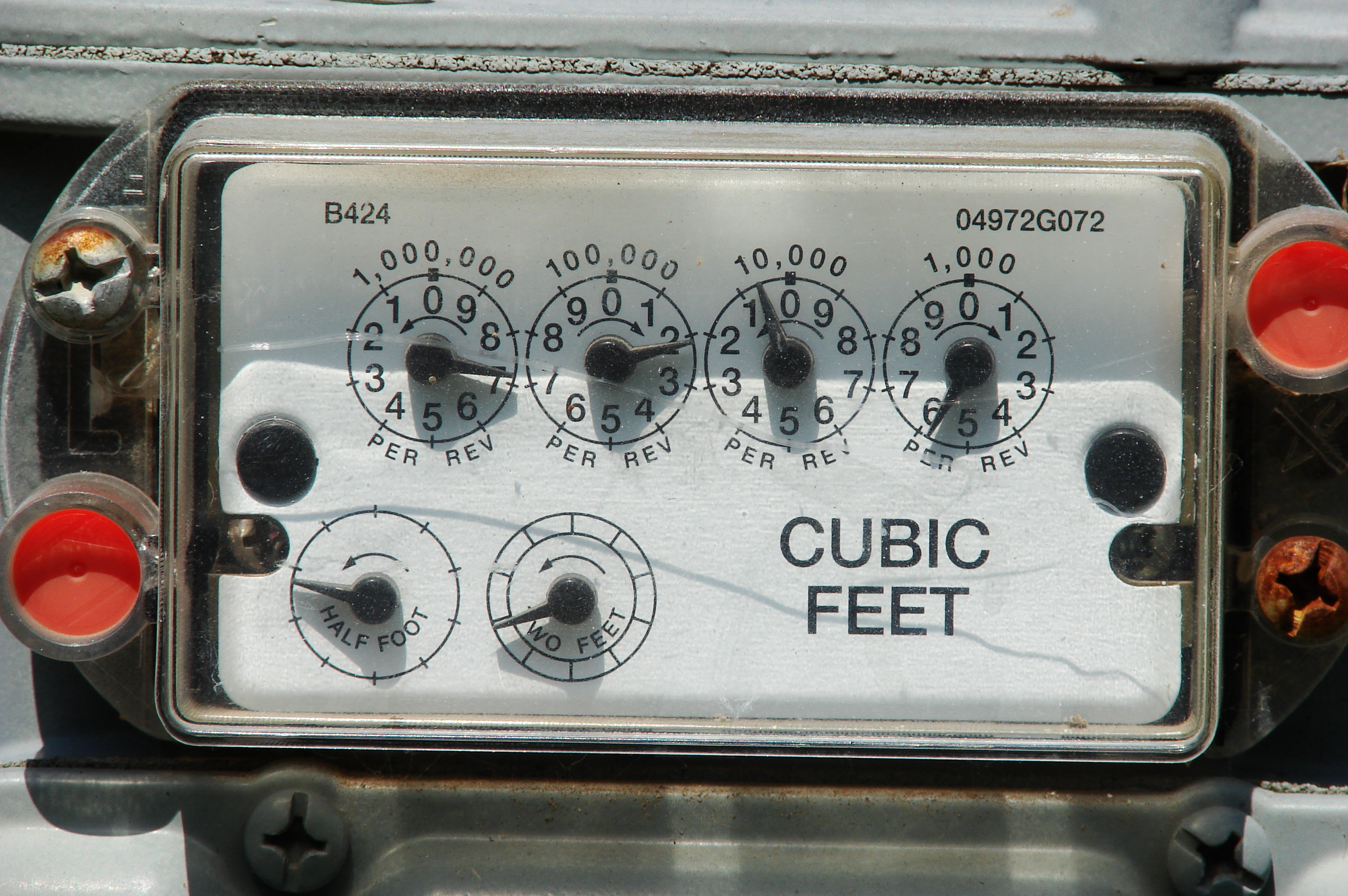
All-analog indicator

== Accuracy ==
Gas meters are required to register the volume of gas consumed within an acceptable degree of accuracy. Any significant error in the registered volume can represent a loss to the gas supplier, or the consumer being overbilled. The accuracy is generally laid down in statute for the location in which the meter is installed. Statutory provisions should also specify a procedure to be followed should the accuracy be disputed.

In the UK, the permitted error for a gas meter manufactured prior to the European Measuring Instruments Directive is ±2%. However, the European Measuring Instrument Directive has harmonised gas meter errors across Europe and consequently meters manufactured since the directive came into force must read within ±3%. Meters whose accuracy is disputed by the customer have to be removed for testing by an approved meter examiner. If the meter is found to be reading outside of the prescribed limits, the supplier has to refund the consumer for gas incorrectly measured while that consumer had that meter (but not vice versa). Any refund is limited to the previous six years. If the meter cannot be tested or its reading is unreliable, the consumer and supplier have to negotiate a settlement. If the meter is found to be reading within limits, the consumer has to pay the costs of testing (and pay any outstanding charges). This contrasts with the position on electric meters, where the test is free and a refund is only given if the date that the meter started to read inaccurately can be determined.

== Gas meter smart metering technologies and usage ==
Smart metering technologies for gas meters refer to advanced systems that enable real-time monitoring, data collection, and analysis of water usage through digital and connected devices. Unlike traditional mechanical gas meters, smart meters are equipped with electronic components that measure water flow and transmit the data wirelessly to utilities and consumers. Smart water meters are integrated with Internet of Things (IoT) platforms, allowing for more efficient gas management and improved customer engagement.

=== RF Technologies and Protocols ===
Radio Frequency (RF) technologies form the backbone of smart metering systems by enabling wireless communication between meters and utility networks. Several RF technologies and protocols are widely used in smart gas meter:

- Wireless M-Bus (WMBus): WMBus, compliant with the European EN 13757 standard, is widely adopted across Europe for water, gas, and electricity metering. It offers secure, reliable, and energy-efficient communication tailored for utility applications.
- Wize technology: A protocol based on the 169 MHz frequency band, WIZE is designed for long-range, low-power communication. It is commonly used in Europe for water and gas metering due to its excellent signal penetration and scalability.
- LoRaWAN: LoRaWAN is valued for its long-range and low-power capabilities, making it suitable for large-scale deployments in both rural and urban settings. It is widely used in industrial and municipal applications.
- Zigbee: Known for its ability to create mesh networks, Zigbee is often used in urban environments where dense connectivity is required. It is energy-efficient and supports secure communication.
- NB-IoT and Cat-M: Narrowband Internet of Things (NB-IoT) and LTE Cat-M are cellular-based technologies that enable direct communication with cellular networks. These protocols are particularly suitable for large-scale deployments in areas with existing cellular infrastructure, offering extended battery life and robust coverage.

=== Application-Layer Protocols in Smart Metering ===
Application-layer protocols operating above RF communication technologies to standardize data exchange, ensure interoperability, and enhance device functionality. These protocols enable seamless integration of meters into broader utility and Internet of Things (IoT) ecosystems.

DLMS/COSEM (Device Language Message Specification/Companion Specification for Energy Metering) is one of the most widely adopted protocols in smart metering. It provides a flexible and standardized framework for data exchange between metering devices and utility systems. The protocol supports various communication technologies, including RF, wired, and cellular networks, and facilitates secure data transfer, structured data management, and remote monitoring.

Other application-layer protocols, such as MQTT (Message Queuing Telemetry Transport) and CoAP (Constrained Application Protocol), are also utilized in smart metering systems, particularly in IoT-centric deployments. These protocols focus on low-bandwidth, high-efficiency communication, ensuring reliable data exchange in diverse environments.

=== Applications and Benefits ===
The adoption of these RF technologies and protocols enables seamless integration of smart water meters into utility systems, offering several advantages:

- Improved Efficiency: Automated data collection reduces manual labor and errors.
- Dynamic Billing: Enables more accurate and flexible billing based on real-time usage.

== Flow measurement calculations ==
Turbine, rotary, and diaphragm meters can be compensated using a calculation specified in American Gas Association Report No. 7. This standardised calculation compensates the quantity of volume as measured to quantity of volume at a set of base conditions. The AGA 7 calculation itself is a simple ratio and is, in essence, a density correction approach to translating the volume or rate of gas at flowing conditions to a volume or rate at base conditions.

Orifice meters are a very commonly used type of meter, and because of their widespread use, the characteristics of gas flow through an orifice meter have been closely studied. American Gas Association Report No. 3 deals with a broad range of issues relating to orifice metering of natural gas, and it specifies an algorithm for calculating natural gas flow rates based on the differential pressure, static pressure, and temperature of a gas with a known composition.

These calculations depend in part on the ideal gas law and also require a gas compressibility calculation in order to account for the fact that real gases are not ideal. A very commonly used compressibility calculation is American Gas Association Report No. 8, detail characterization.

== Thread Sizing Standards and Dimensions ==
=== Thread sizing standards ===
Residential, commercial and industrial gas meters have their own standard thread sizes. The gas meter is connected to customer piping through a swivel and nut, which has a dedicated set of thread sizes. Threads are helical structures used on screws, bolts, pipes, and other fasteners to facilitate the joining of components. Their design and standardization vary depending on their intended application, material, and region.

Standardized Thread Systems Several organizations and systems have established standards for threads to ensure interchangeability and reliability:

- ISO Metric Thread (M)
  - The most widely used thread standard internationally.
  - Specified by the International Organization for Standardization (ISO).
  - Threads are defined by their nominal diameter and pitch (distance between threads) in millimeters. For example, an M10x1.5 thread has a nominal diameter of 10 mm and a pitch of 1.5 mm.
- Unified Thread Standard (UTS)
  - Predominantly used in the United States and Canada.
  - Includes Unified Coarse (UNC), Unified Fine (UNF), and Unified Extra Fine (UNEF) threads.
  - Thread sizes are denoted by a number or fractional diameter (e.g., 1/4-20 UNC, where "1/4" is the diameter in inches and "20" indicates 20 threads per inch).
- British Standard Whitworth (BSW)
  - One of the oldest thread standards, primarily used in the UK and former British territories.
  - Defined by the Whitworth profile, which has a 55° thread angle.
  - Sizes are specified by nominal diameter in inches and threads per inch (TPI).
- National Pipe Thread (NPT)
  - A U.S. standard for tapered threads commonly used in piping systems to create a seal.
  - Threads are specified by nominal pipe size (NPS) and TPI.
- Trapezoidal and Acme Threads
  - Used in applications requiring high strength and load capacity, such as lead screws.
  - Trapezoidal threads are common in Europe, while Acme threads are more prevalent in the U.S.

=== Regional Variations and Interoperability ===
Thread standards can vary between regions and industries, often requiring adaptors or conversion charts for compatibility. For example:

- Metric threads dominate in Europe and Asia, while inch-based UTS threads are more common in North America.
- Adapting threads between systems may involve compromises in strength and fit.

== Main Suppliers ==
The top ten depends on the ranking methods,

- Honeywell
- Sagemcom
- Itron
- Apator
- Landis+Gyr
- Xylem (formerly Sensus)

== See also ==
- Automatic Meter Reading
- Flow conditioning#Effects on flow measurement devices
- Electricity meter
- Flow measurement
- Gas flow computer
- Gas meter prover
- Meter-Bus
- Julius Pintsch
- Smart meter
- Thermal mass flow meter
- Turnaround document (way of collecting data from)
- Utility submeter
- Water meter
