= Flow control valve =

Valve that regulates the flow or pressure of a fluid

A flow control valve regulates the flow or pressure of a fluid. Control valves normally respond to signals generated by independent devices such as flow meters or temperature gauges.

== Operation ==
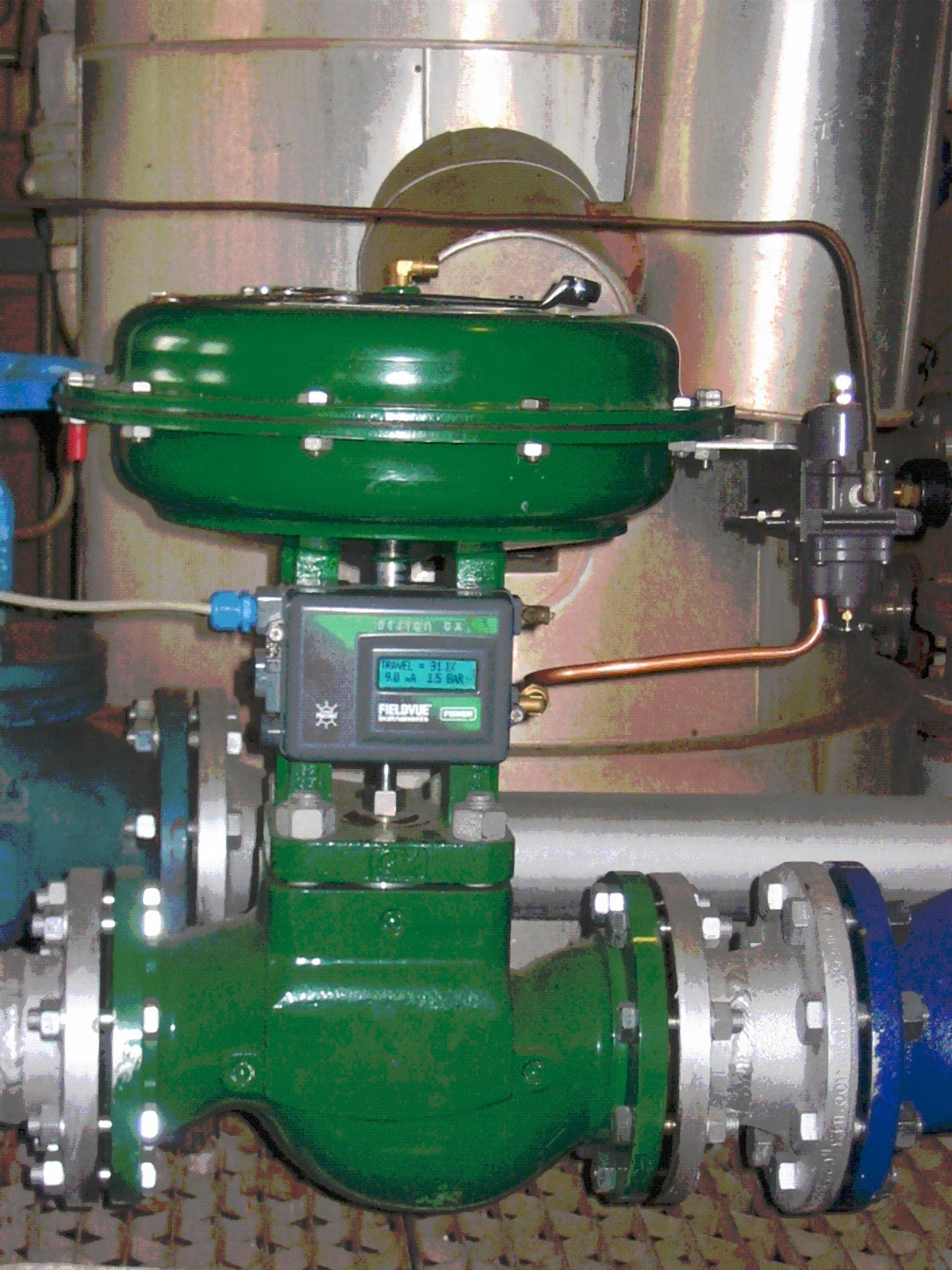
Globe control valve with the pneumatic actuator and smart positioner. The loop current and stem travel are displayed.

Control valves are normally fitted with actuators and positioners. Pneumatically-actuated globe valves and diaphragm valves are widely used for control purposes in many industries, although quarter-turn types such as (modified) ball and butterfly valves are also used.

Control valves can also work with hydraulic actuators (also known as hydraulic pilots). These types of valves are also known as automatic control valves. The hydraulic actuators respond to changes of pressure or flow and will open or close the valve. Automatic control valves do not require an external power source, meaning that the fluid pressure is enough to open and close them.

Flow control valves, a type of automatic control valve, regulate fluid flow by maintaining a predetermined flow rate, independent of variations in system pressure. These valves achieve this using pressure-compensated mechanisms, which automatically adjust the valve opening to ensure a steady flow rate. Some designs incorporate a dual-chamber configuration that enhances regulation at lower pressures, improving stability in applications such as irrigation, industrial water systems, and municipal water distribution.

Additionally, pilot-operated flow control valves are used in more advanced systems to provide precise flow adjustments while optimizing energy efficiency. These configurations allow the valve to respond dynamically to changing conditions, ensuring efficient fluid management.

Automatic control valves include pressure reducing valves, flow control valves, back-pressure sustaining valves, altitude valves, and relief valves.

== Application ==
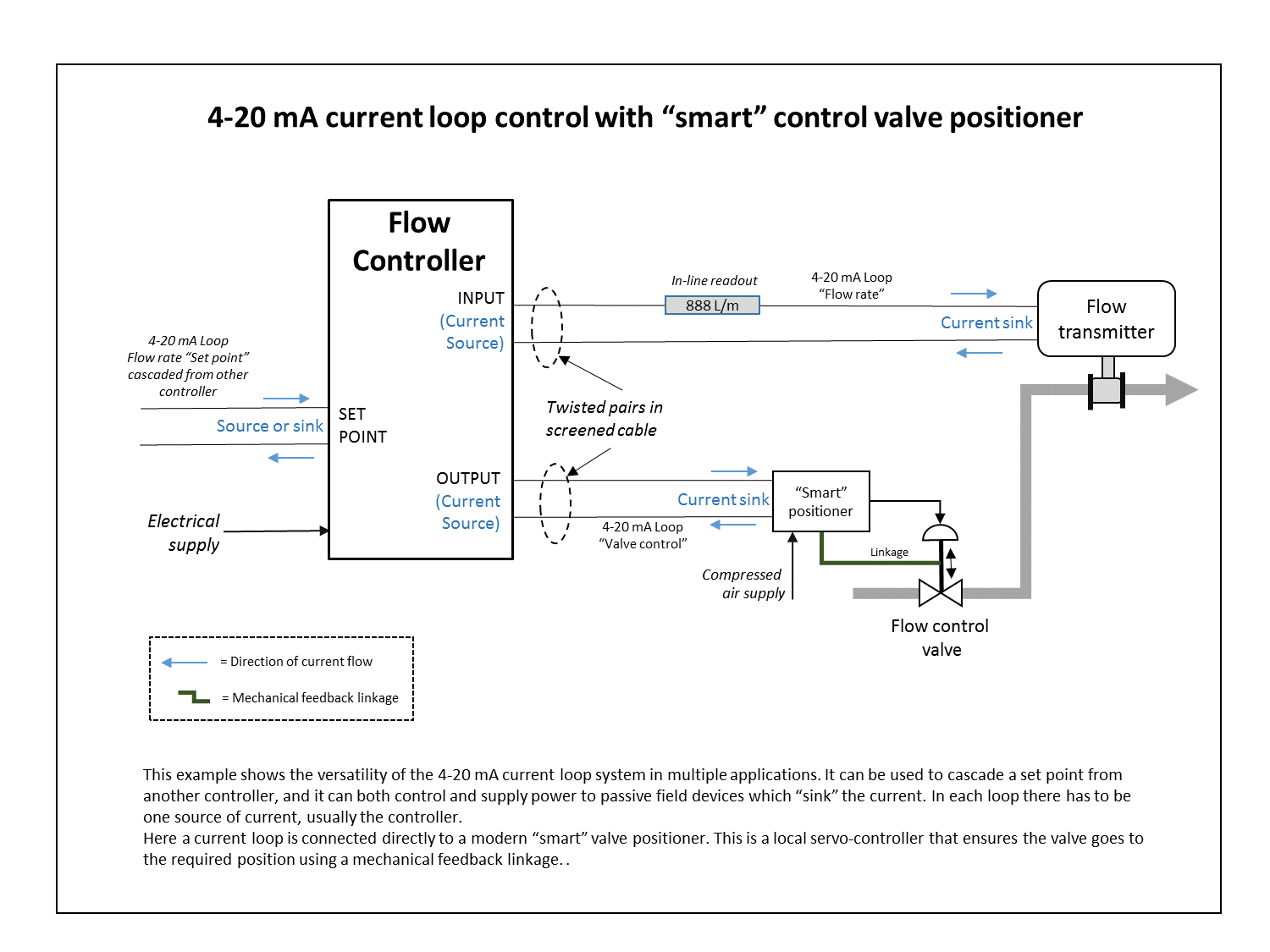
Example of current loops used for sensing and control. Specific example of a smart valve positioner used.

Process plants consist of hundreds, or even thousands, of control loops all networked together to produce a product to be offered for sale. Each of these control loops is designed to keep some important process variable, such as pressure, flow, level, or temperature, within a required operating range to ensure the quality of the end product. Each loop receives and internally creates disturbances that detrimentally affect the process variable, and interaction from other loops in the network provides disturbances that influence the process variable.

To reduce the effect of these load disturbances, sensors and transmitters collect information about the process variable and its relationship to some desired set point. A controller then processes this information and decides what must be done to get the process variable back to where it should be after a load disturbance occurs. When all the measuring, comparing, and calculating are done, some type of final control element must implement the strategy selected by the controller. The most common final control element in the process control industries is the control valve. The control valve manipulates a flowing fluid, such as gas, steam, water, or chemical compounds, to compensate for the load disturbance and keep the regulated process variable as close as possible to the desired set point.

== Images ==
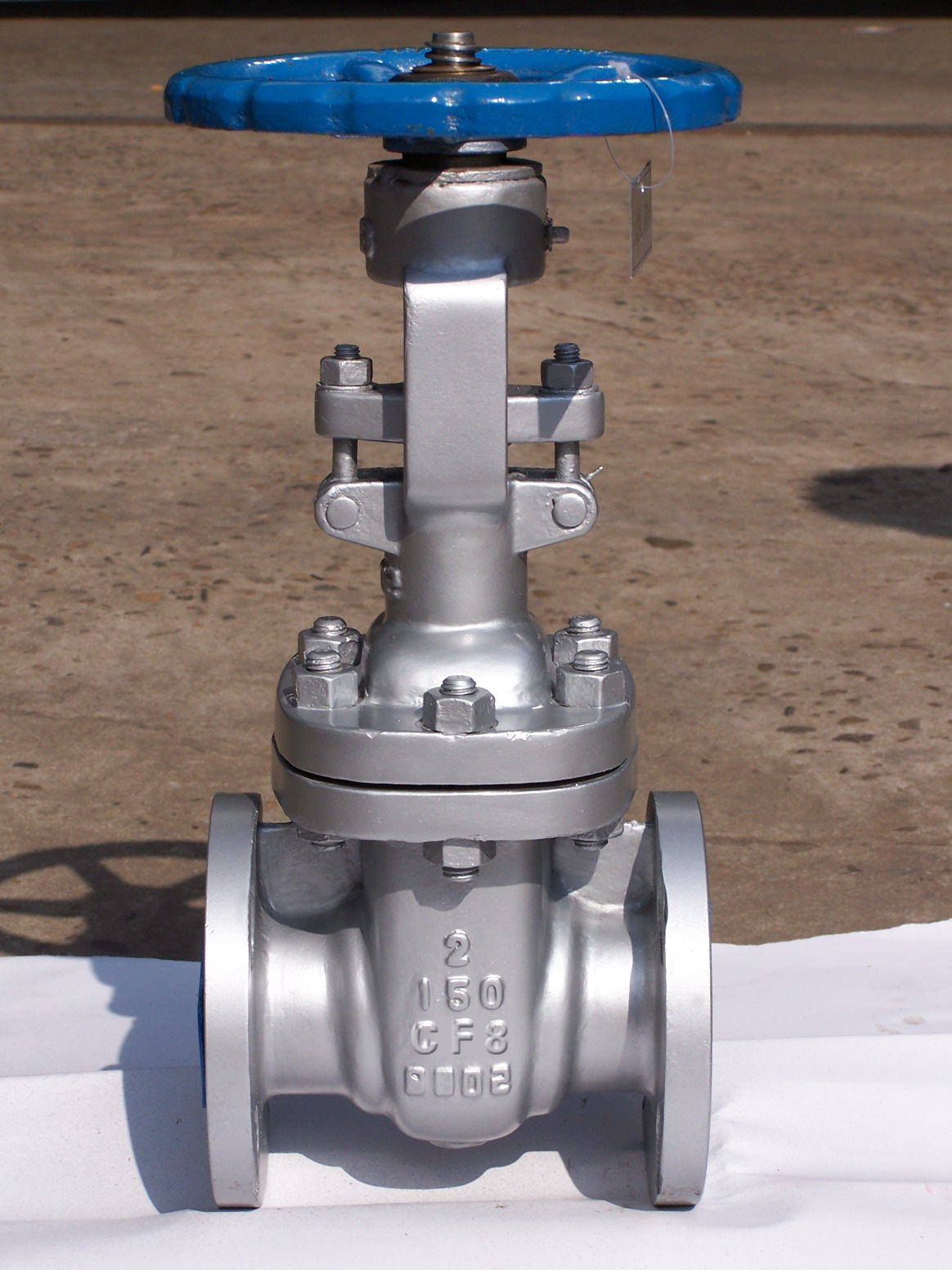
Stainless steel gate valve

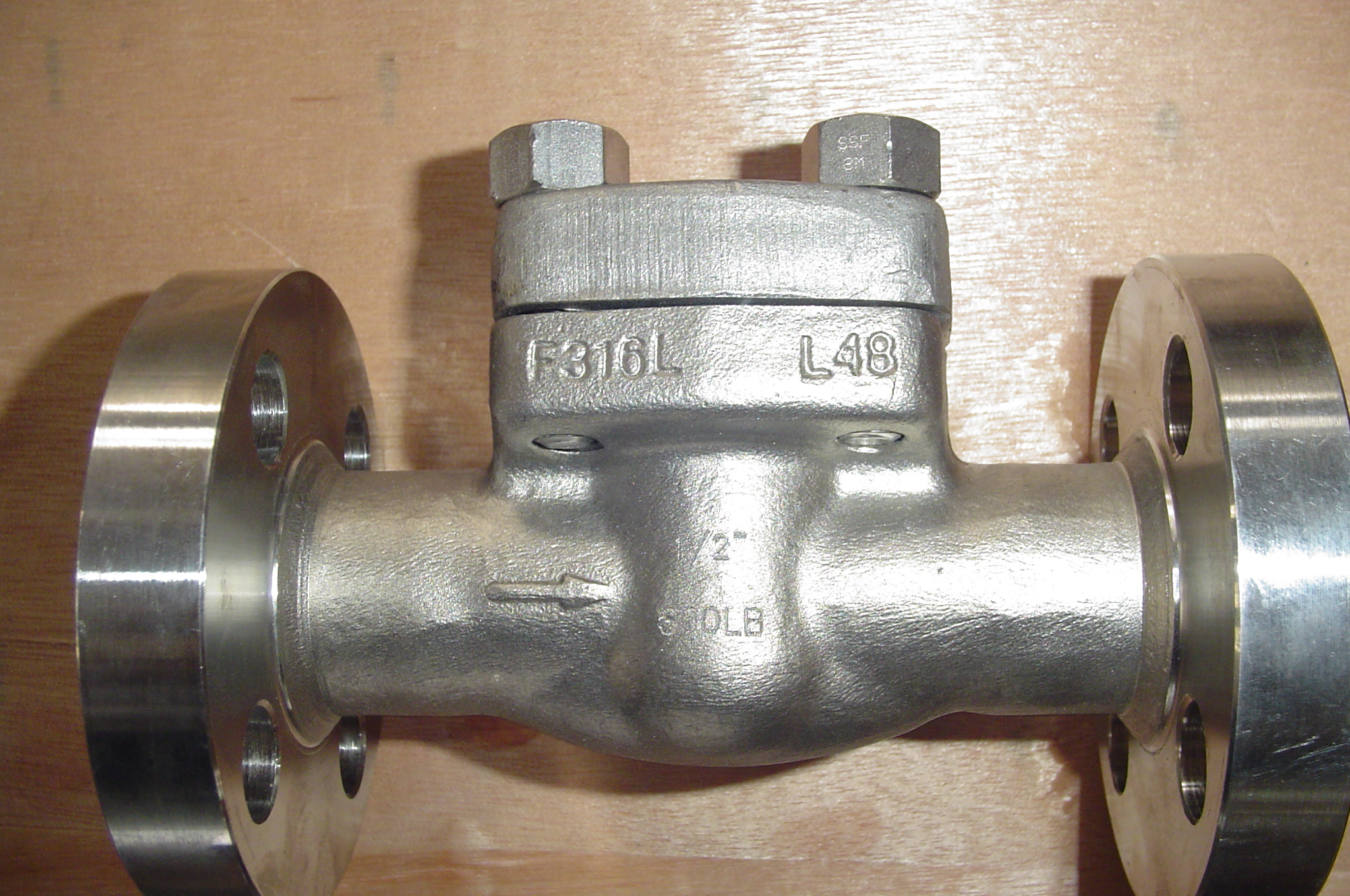
Stainless steel check valve

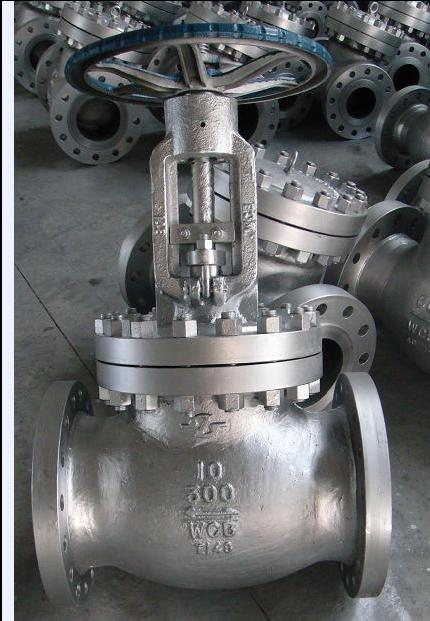
Carbon steel globe valve

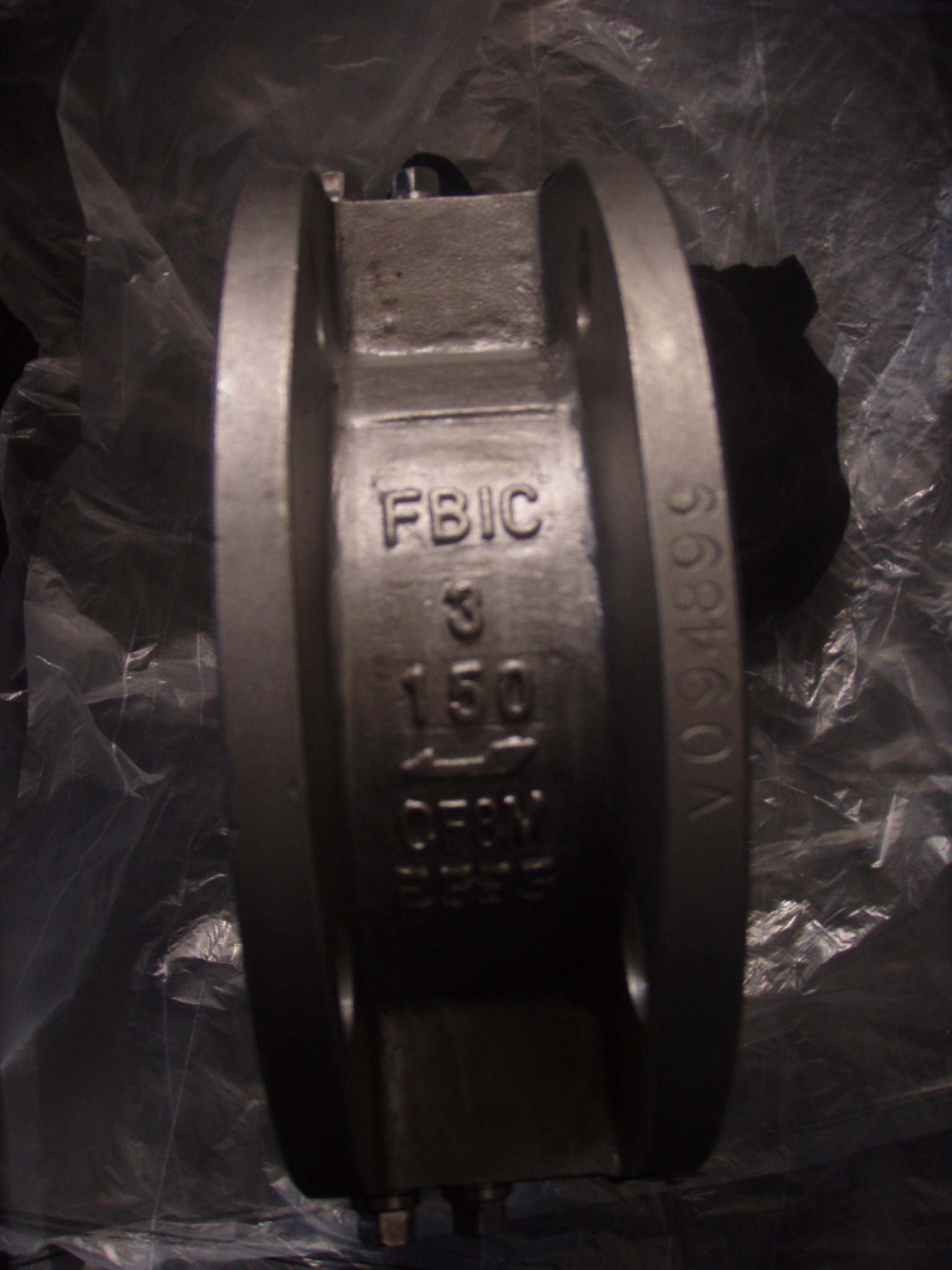
Stainless steel wafer check valve

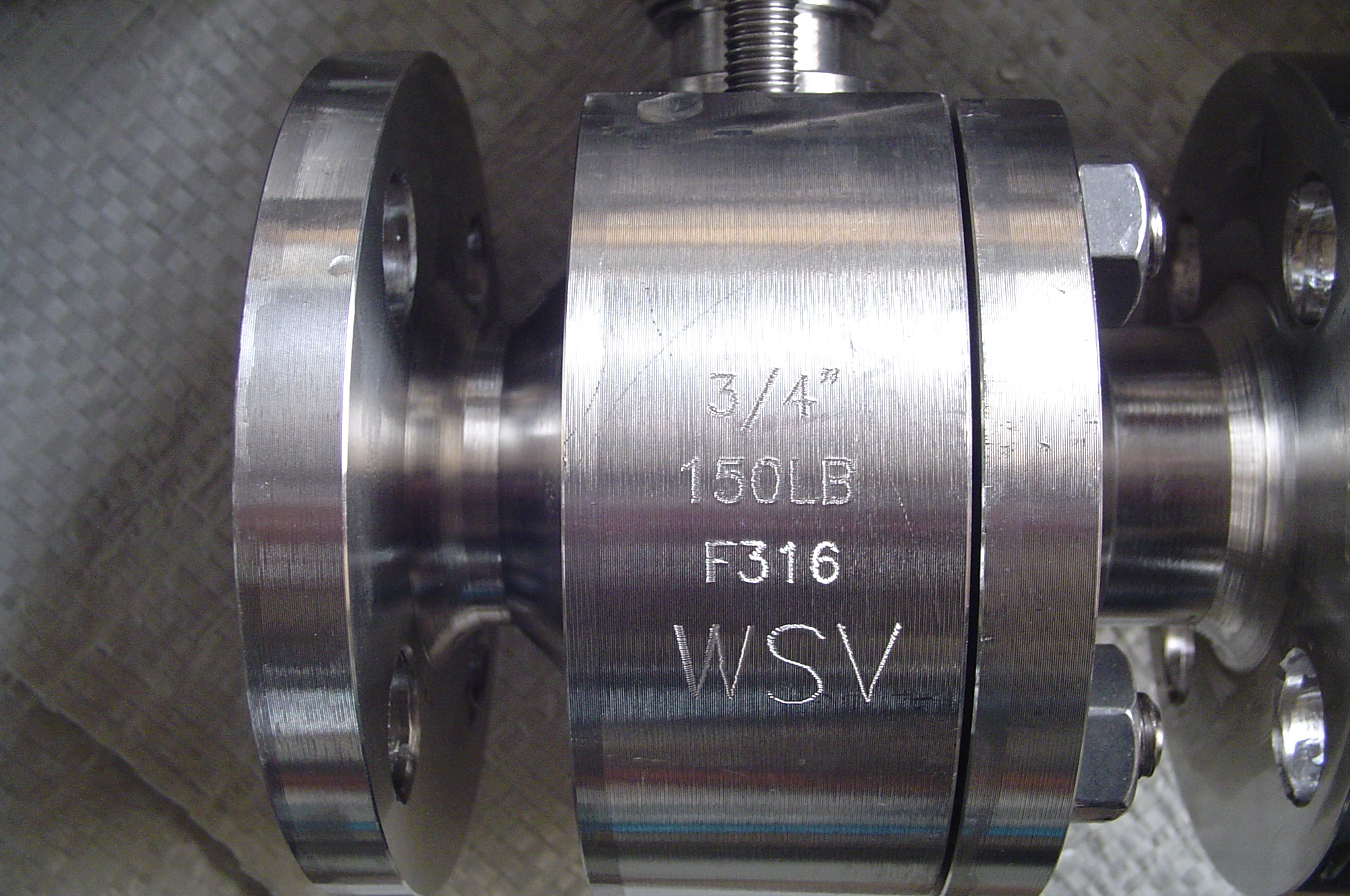
Stainless steel ball valve

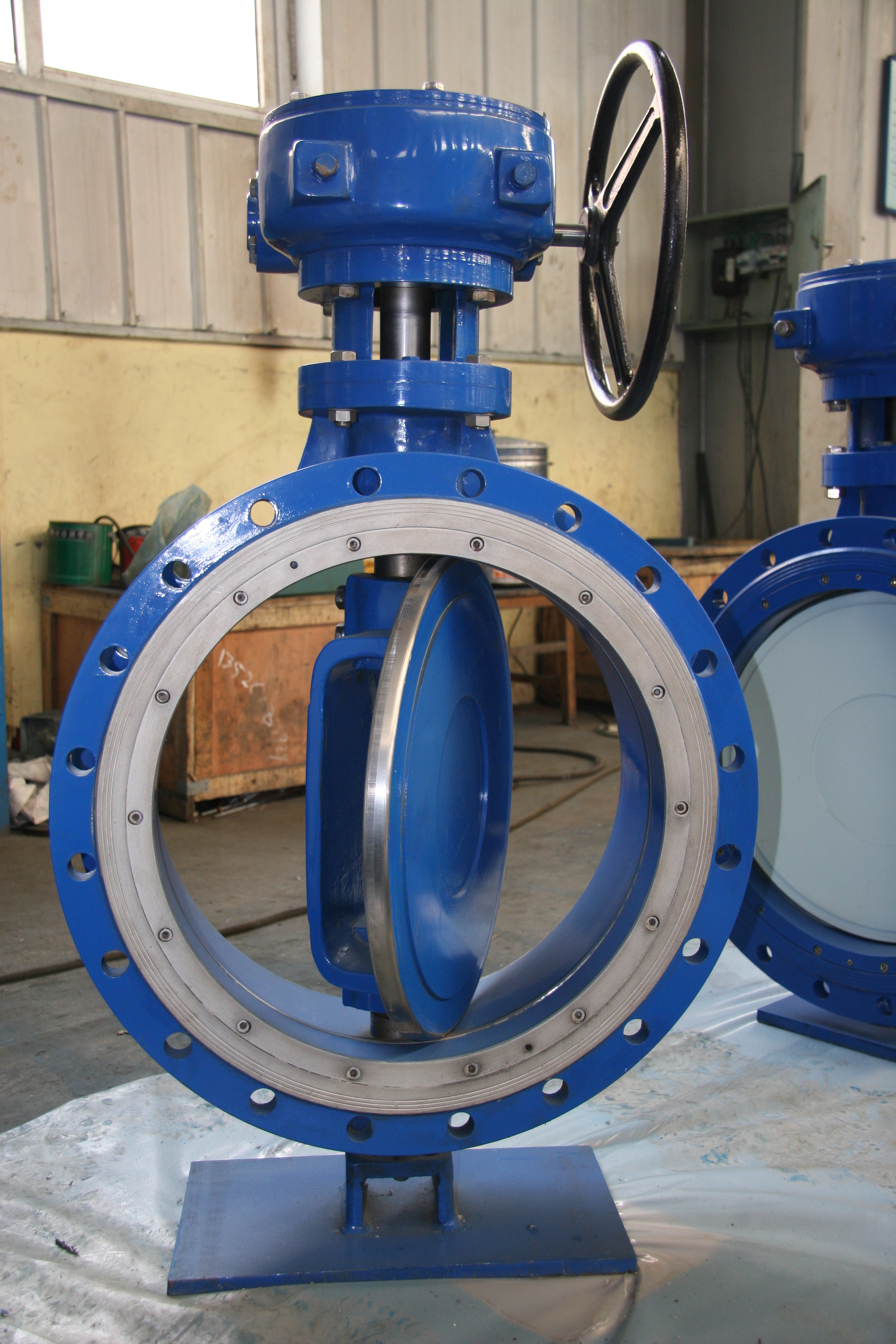
Cast iron butterfly valve

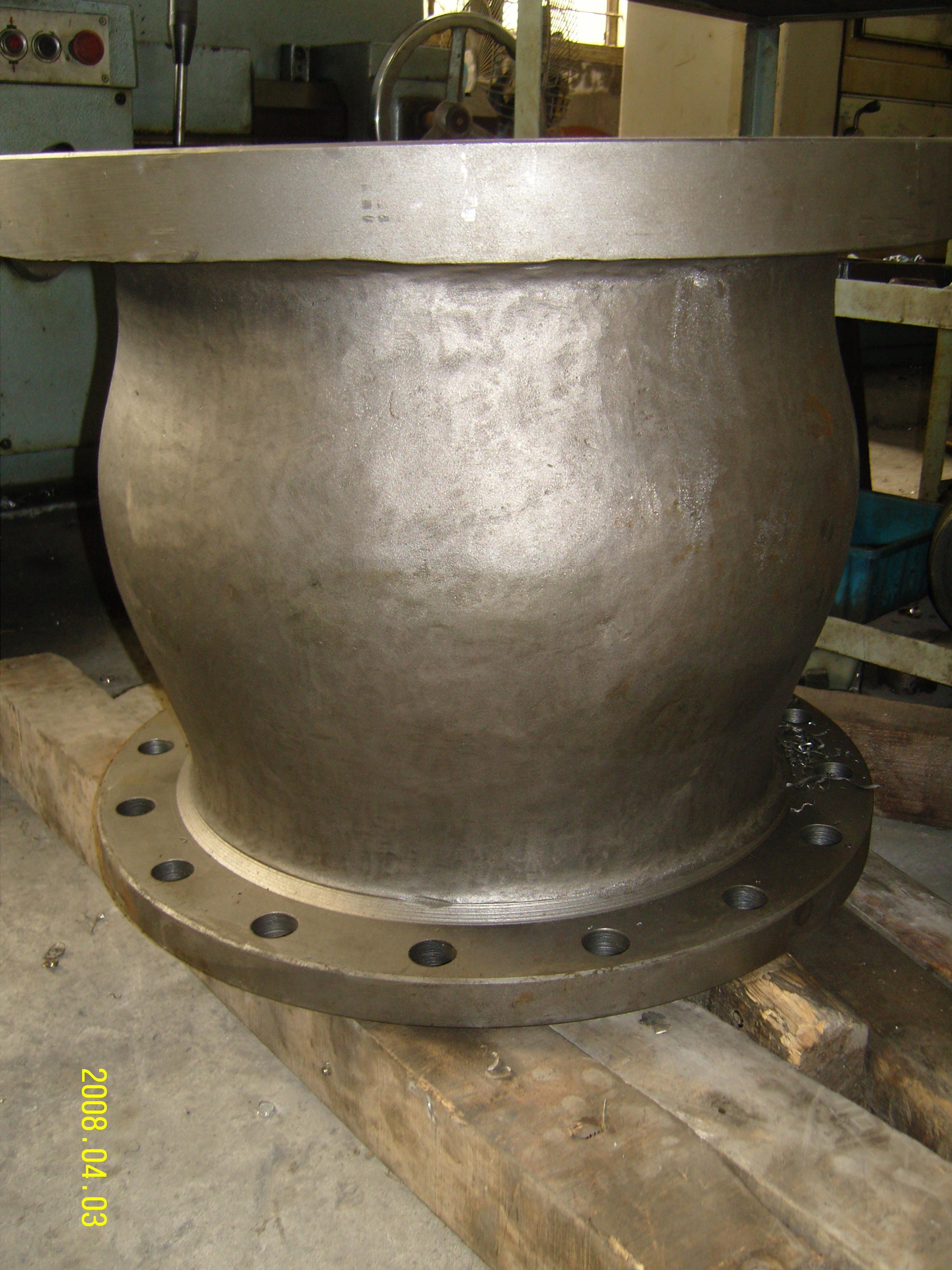
Flanged nozzle inconel check valve or axial check valve

== See also ==
- Ball valve
- Butterfly valve
- Check valve
- Control valve
- Diaphragm valve
- Flow limiter
- Flow measurement
- Gate valve
- Globe valve
- Mass flow controller
- Needle valve
- Plastic pressure pipe systems
- Thermal mass flow meter
