= Gas volume corrector =

Gas volume corrector - device for calculating, summing and determining increments of gas volume, measured by gas meter if it were operating base conditions. For this purpose, uses as input the gas volume, measured by the gas meter and other parameters such as: gas pressure and temperature. It is used for the settlement of trade wholesale gas.

There are two types of gas volume correctors:

Type 1- gas volume corrector with specific types of transducers for pressure and temperature or temperature only. This type of gas volume corrector is powered by battery.

Type 2 - a device that converts separate transmitters with external temperature and pressure, or temperature only and for separate calculator, which may be approved separately. This type of gas volume corrector is powered by mains.
