= Orifice =

An orifice is any opening, mouth, hole or vent, as in a pipe, a plate, or a body

- Body orifice, any opening in the body of an animal
- Orifice plate, a restriction used to measure flow or to control pressure or flow, sometimes given specialised names:
  - Calibrated orifice, used to control pressure or flow
  - Restrictive flow orifice, used to control flow
  - Miss Shilling's orifice, used to control flow in the engines of early Spitfire and Hurricane fighter aeroplanes
- Back Orifice, a tendentious computer program designed for remote system administration

== See also ==
- Choked flow
- Needle valve
- Nozzle
- Venturi effect
- Flow measurement
