= Flow limiter =

Flow control device

A flow limiter or flow restrictor is a device to restrict the flow of a fluid, in general a gas or a liquid. Some designs use single stage or multi-stage orifice plates to handle high and low flow rates. Flow limiters are often used in manufacturing plants as well as households. Safety is usually the main purpose of using a flow limiter. An example is manufacturing facilities and laboratories using flow limiters to prevent injury or death from noxious gases that are in use. The flow limiter prevents gases from causing injury or death by reducing their cross-sectional area where gas flows.

== Uses ==
- Reduce flow of fluid (velocity) through a system, e.g. to reduce water usage in a shower
- Reduce the amount of gas passing through a system
- Reduce pressure in a system
- Applications in medical instrumentation
- As a safety valve to provide limited flow after closing in the event of a broken hose. (See Hydraulic fuse).

== Specifications ==
- Orifice diameter
- Flow tolerance
- Media temperature
- Maximum flow rate for liquid or gas
- Maximum pressure

== Design ==
Flow limiters are designed with the intent of reducing the cross-section area with a plate and a laser drill is used to create a small hole. The diameter of the hole will vary based on the flow rate, inlet pressure, and outlet pressure. The design can also be created with drilled orifices with threaded ends. Another flow limiter design option is the use of porous media. This design is created with hundreds of pores within a central plug. The porous media design has the purpose of lowering the velocity of flow, and the lifespan is extended with lower rates of erosion. The disadvantage to the porous media design is the poor removal of particles and a drop in pressure. Debris buildup will not be a concern with the porous media flow limiter with multiple holes allowing liquid or gas to flow with ease.

== Features ==
Flow limiters have features that may be added to expand on their applications. The device can have bidirectional flow and have increased flow control with multiple openings. Flow limiters can also be made of various materials to better improve quality and applications. The materials involve the use of metals, metal alloys, and thermoplastics. Metals like copper and aluminium are materials that have good conductivity with heat and electricity. Stainless steel has the material strength to withstand high pressures and resists chemical corrosion. Flow limiters are also capable of being designed out of nylon and fluoropolymers. For the connections to the flow limiter, there are a variety of ends featuring plain ends, pipe clamp ends, flanges, and compression fittings.

== See also ==
- Flow control valve
- Mass flow controller
- Needle valve
