= RFO =

RFO may refer to:

- Radio Filharmonisch Orkest, a Dutch radio orchestra
- Range Forest Officer, a forestry officer in India
- Réseau France Outre-mer, now Réseau Outre-Mer 1ère, a network of French radio and television stations
- Read For Ownership, in computer cache coherency protocols
- Reason For Outage, in computing and telecommunications
- Request for offer, in procurement
- Residual fuel oil, a heavy product from oil refineries
- Restrictive flow orifice, a device to limit the danger of uncontrolled flow
- RF Online, a multiplayer online role-playing computer game
- Royal Flight of Oman, a military unit
- Russian Fascist Organization, a Russian émigré group active in Manchuria before World War II
