= Turndown ratio =

Engineering ratio

Turndown ratio refers to the width of the operational range of a device, and is defined as the ratio of the maximum capacity to minimum capacity. For example, a device with a maximum output of 10 units and a minimum output of 2 units has a turndown ratio of 5. The term is commonly used with measurement devices and combustion plant like boilers and gasifiers.

== Flow meters ==
In flow measurement, the turndown ratio indicates the range of flow that a flow meter is able to measure with acceptable accuracy. It is also known as rangeability. It is important when choosing a flow meter technology for a specific application. If a gas flow to be measured is expected to vary between 100,000 m^{3} per day and 1,000,000 m^{3} per day, the specific application has a turndown ratio of at least 10:1. Therefore, the meter requires a turndown ratio of at least 10:1. If the meter had an advertised maximum flow of 2,000,000 m^{3} per day then the required turndown ratio would be 20:1.

The turndown ratio of each type of meter is limited by theoretical considerations and by practical considerations. For example, orifice meters create a pressure drop in the measured fluid proportional to the square of the velocity. Therefore, the range of differential pressure can become too large and compromise accuracy. It can also create process problems such as hydrate formation, and in the case of measuring the discharge of a compressor, there is a limit to how much pressure loss is acceptable.

=== Typical turndown ratio of various meter types ===
The examples are here for gas flow, but the same meter types can be used on liquids as well, with similar turndown ratios. Note that meter manufacturers state their products' turndown ratios—a specific product may have a turndown ratio that varies from the list below.

A thermal mass flow meter has a turndown ratio of 1000:1.

An orifice plate meter has a practical turndown ratio of 3:1.

A turbine meter has a turndown ratio of 10:1.

Rotary positive displacement meters have a turndown ratio of between 10:1 and 80:1, depending on the manufacturer and the application. Diaphragm meters are considered to have a turndown ratio of 80:1.

Multipath ultrasonic meters often have a stated turndown ratio of 50:1.

== Boilers ==
Boiler turndown ratio is the ratio of maximum heat output to the minimum level of heat output at which the boiler will operate efficiently or controllably. Many boilers are designed to operate at a variety of output levels. As the desired temperature/pressure point is approached, the heat source is progressively turned down. If pressure/temperature falls, the heat source is progressively turned up. If a boiler application requires it to operate at a low proportion of its maximum output, a high turndown ratio is required. Conversely, in applications where the operational conditions are not expected to vary significantly (for example, a large power plant), a low turndown ratio will be sufficient.

If the heating plant is only working at a small fraction of its maximum and the turndown ratio is too low, at some point the burner will still need to be shut off when the desired pressure/temperature is achieved. This in turn leads to a rapid reduction in temperature/pressure, requiring the boiler to restart. Cycling frequency can be as high as 12 times per hour. This is undesirable, as flue gases are purged during both the shut-down and start-up phases, leading to energy losses and therefore inefficiency. Additionally, typical startup times for boilers are in the order of one to two minutes, leading to an inability to respond to sudden load demands.

=== Typical turndown ratios for various boiler types ===
Electricity

As there are no combustion losses associated with electricity, nor delays in system startup, is it unusual to have any means of modulating down the energy supply (i.e., turndown ratio is 1).

Gas

Gas boilers can be designed for turndown ratios of 10–12 with little to no loss in combustion efficiency, while some gas burners may achieve a ratio of 35. However, typical turndown ratio is 5.

In the search for increased efficiency, even very small gas boilers have modulating burners these days. In practice only boilers with fan assisted fuel/air circulation will have the modulating feature. The fan also mixes gas and air more thoroughly, so achieving more efficient combustion. If the boiler is of the high efficiency condensing type, high turndown ratios are feasible and the higher the turndown ratio, the more efficient it will be.

Every time a gas/oil boiler stops, it has to be "purged" with cold air to remove any combustible gases that may have accumulated in the boiler before restarting. (This to prevent possible explosion.) This cold air takes heat from the boiler every time this happens. Higher turndown ratios mean fewer stops and starts and hence fewer losses.

Oil

Oil burning boilers can achieve turndown ratios as high as 20, but typically only 2 to 4 with conventional burner designs.

Small domestic "vaporising" (i.e. burning kerosene or 28 second oil) burners do not modulate at all and are relatively inefficient. Boilers using the pressure jet type of burner, i.e. with a fan, (usually with 35 second oil) can achieve a turndown ratio of 2, while the rotary cup type burner can achieve 4. Condensing oil boilers are fairly unusual; the condensate from the combustion of oil is far more aggressive than gas, mainly due to sulphur content. These days oil companies are reducing sulphur content of oil on environmental grounds, so this may change. However, due to problem of mixing the oil and air, turndown ratios of greater than four are uncommon.

Coal

These days mechanised coal boilers only occur in large industrial plant due to the convenience and easy availability of gas. Theoretically coal burning plant can have quite a high turndown ratio, and in the days of hand firing coal boilers this was common.

On systems where coal is burned on a grate, turndown ratio must be greater than 1 due to the fact that a sudden reduction/cessation of the load can leave many tons of burning fuel on the grate.
