= Straightener =

Straightener may refer to:

- Straightener (band), Japanese alternative rock band
- A straightening iron, a kind of hair iron
- Any substance used in hair straightening
- A shaft straightener, a device used in making an arrow or spear
- Flow straightener, a key element of a wind tunnel
- Straightener (metalworking), a device used in metalworking to straighten material before it is fed to a stamping press
- "Wheels of Confusion/The Straightener", a song from Black Sabbath Vol. 4
