= Sage Metering =

American thermal mass flow meter manufacturer

Sage Metering, Inc.
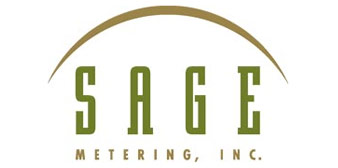
- Industry: Instrumentation
- Founder: Bob Steinberg, David Huey, William Mark Crawford and Robert Trescott
- Headquarters: Monterey, CA
- Products: flow meters
- Website: www.sagemetering.com

Sage Metering is a manufacturer of thermal mass flow meters that are used to measure and monitor gas mass flow for a variety of industrial, environmental and municipal applications. The company headquarters is in Monterey, California and the company employs fewer than 50 employees.

== Technological advancements ==
In 2003, the firm introduced the first hybrid-digital thermal mass flow meter in lieu of the traditional Wheatstone bridge technology. It provided improved resolution and reproducibility.

The firm introduced a portable battery-operated thermal mass flow meter, known as the Prism®, which can log up to 3,800 gas flow points during ten hours of operation. It was awarded the Flow Control Innovations Award in 2011.

Sage Metering was the first thermal flow meter manufacturer to provide a unique and easy to invoke on-site calibration verification. (This saves time and money since the user does not have to remove the meter and return it to the factory (or a third party) for annual flow meter calibration). The advance also makes it possible to use thermal mass meters in environmental applications to report greenhouse gas emissions (GHG) per EPA regulations, as well as quantify carbon credits per U.S. carbon credit protocols. The firm received the 2012 Flow Control Innovations Award for this advancement.

== Awards ==
- Flow Control 2006 Innovations Award Winner
- Flow Control 2011 Innovations Award Winner
- Flow Control 2012 Innovations Award Winner
