= Flow coefficient =

Measure of a device's efficiency at allowing fluid flow

The flow coefficient of a device is a relative measure of its efficiency at allowing fluid flow. It describes the relationship between the pressure drop across an orifice valve or other assembly and the corresponding flow rate. A greater restriction in flow will create a larger pressure drop across a device and thus a smaller flow coefficient, conversely device with little restriction in flow will have a small pressure drop and a larger flow coefficient. For example, the flow coefficient of a 1" ball valve may be 80 while a similarly sized globe valve in the same application may be 10.

Mathematically the flow coefficient C_{v} (or flow-capacity rating of valve) can be expressed as

$$C_\text{v} = Q \sqrt{\frac{\text{RD}}{\Delta P}},$$

where,

Q is the rate of flow (expressed in US gallons per minute),
RD is the relative density of the fluid (for water = 1),
ΔP is the pressure drop across the valve (expressed in psi).

In more practical terms, the flow coefficient C_{v} is the volume (in US gallons) of water at 60 °F (16 °C) that will flow per minute through a valve with a pressure drop of 1 psi (6.9 kPa) across the valve.

The use of the flow coefficient offers a standard method of comparing valve capacities and sizing valves for specific applications that is widely accepted by industry. The general definition of the flow coefficient can be expanded into equations modeling the flow of liquids, gases and steam using the discharge coefficient.

For gas flow in a pneumatic system the C_{v} for the same assembly can be used with a more complex equation. Absolute pressures (psia) must be used for gas rather than simply differential pressure.

For air flow at room temperature, when the outlet pressure is less than 1/2 the absolute inlet pressure, the flow becomes quite simple (although it reaches sonic velocity internally). With C_{v} = 1.0 and 200 psia inlet pressure, the flow is 100 standard cubic feet per minute (scfm). The flow is proportional to the absolute inlet pressure, so the flow in scfm would equal the C_{v} flow coefficient if the inlet pressure were reduced to 2 psia and the outlet were connected to a vacuum with less than 1 psi absolute pressure (1.0 scfm when C_{v} = 1.0, 2 psia input).

== Flow factor ==
The metric equivalent flow factor (K_{v}) is calculated using metric units:

$$K_\text{v} = Q \sqrt{\frac{\text{RD}}{\Delta P}},$$

where,

K_{v} is the flow factor (expressed in m^{3}/h),
Q is the flowrate (expressed in m^{3}/h),
RD is the relative density of the fluid (for water = 1),
∆P is the differential pressure across the device (expressed in bar).

K_{v} can be calculated from C_{v} using the equation

$$C_{\text{v}} = 1.156 \cdot K_\text{v}.$$

The k_{v} factor or value as it is also called is defined in VDI/VDE Richtlinien No. 2173. A simplified version of the definition is: The k_{v} factor of a valve indicates "The water flow in m^{3}/h, at a pressure drop across the valve of 1 kgf/cm^{2} when the valve is completely open. The complete definition also says that the flow medium must have a density of 1000 kg/m^{3} and a kinematic viscosity of 10^{−6} m^{2}/s, e.g. water.

== See also ==
- Discharge coefficient
