= Gas meter prover =

Device for checking gas meter accuracy

A gas meter prover is a device to verify the accuracy of a gas meter. Provers are typically used in gas meter repair facilities, municipal gas meter shops, and public works shops. Provers work by passing a known volume of air through a meter, while monitoring the gas meter's register, index, or internal displacement. The prover determines the meter factor, which is the volume of air passed divided by the volume of air measured.

== Types ==
=== Manual bell prover ===
Since the early 1900s, bell provers have been the most common reference standard used in gas meter proving and has provided standards for the gas industry that is unfortunately susceptible to a myriad of immeasurable uncertainties.

A bell prover (commonly referred to in the industry as a "bell") consists of a vertical inner tank surrounded by an outer shell. A space between the inner tank and outer shell is filled with a sealing liquid, usually oil. An inverted tank, called the bell, is placed over the inner tank. The liquid provides an air-tight seal. Bell provers are typically counterweighted to provide positive pressure through a hose and valve connected to a meter. Sometimes rollers or guides are installed on the moving part of the bell which allows for smooth linear movement without the potential for immeasurable pressure differentials caused by the bell rocking back or forth.

Bells provide a volume of air that may be predetermined by calculated temperature, pressure and the effective diameter of the bell. Bell scales are unique to each bell and are usually attached vertically with a needle-like pointer. When proving a meter using a manually controlled bell, an operator must first fill the bell with a controlled air supply or raise it manually by opening a valve and pulling a chained mechanism, seal the bell and meter and check the sealed system for leaks, determine the flow rate needed for the meter, install a special flow-rate cap on the meter outlet, note the starting points of both the bell scale and meter index, release the bell valve to pass air through the meter, observe the meter index and calculate the time it takes to pass the predetermined amount of air, then manually calculate the meter's proof accounting for bell air and meter temperature and in some cases other environmental factors.

Uncertainties commonly experienced, and possibly unaccounted for within a test when using bell provers can lead to incorrect proofs, by which an operator may adjust a gas meter incorrectly. Temperature inconsistencies between the bell air, meter and connecting hoses can account for most meter proof inaccuracies. Other factors may be mechanical such as stuck or sticky bell rollers or guides, loose piping connections or valves, a dent in the test area of the bell, incorrect counterweights, and human errors in the operation or calculations.

=== Automated bell prover ===
The invention of programmable logic controllers (PLC) allowed gas meter repair facilities to automate most of the manual bell prover's process and calculations. Instead of manually raising and lowering the bell prover, solenoid valves connected to a PLC control air flows through the meter. Temperature, pressure, and humidity sensors can be used to feed data into an automated bell PLC, and calculations for meter proofs can be handled by a computer or electronic device programmed for such a purpose. In the early 1990s, the PLC was replaced by PACs (Programmable Automated Controls) and modern computer systems. Sensors to read the index of a meter were added to further automate the process, removing much of the human error associated with manual bell provers.

=== Sonic nozzle prover ===
The natural evolution of the automated bell and PAC controls lend itself to the use of vacuum driven provers with arrays of sonic nozzles (utilizing choked flow to provide precise flow rates. Such a use eliminated the need for a bell, as the flow rate is provided through the nozzles. When sufficient vacuum is applied to a sonic nozzle it creates a constant flow rate. Bernoulli's principle is applied to calculate the chosen flow rates chosen by the user or automated by a computer. Computers and PAC systems automate the process, and most sonic nozzle provers are capable of displaying not only meter proofs to a user but are also capable of transmitting proofs as well as other important data to database systems across a computer network.
