= Mass flow controller =

Device that controls liquid and gas flow

Internal block diagram

A mass flow controller (MFC) is a device used to measure and control the flow of liquids and gases. A mass flow controller is designed and calibrated to control a specific type of liquid or gas at a particular range of flow rates. The MFC can be given a setpoint from 0 to 100% of its full scale range but is typically operated in the 10 to 90% of full scale where the best accuracy is achieved. The device will then control the rate of flow to the given setpoint. MFCs can be either analog or digital. A digital flow controller is usually able to control more than one type of fluid whereas an analog controller is limited to the fluid for which it was calibrated.

All mass flow controllers have an inlet port, an outlet port, a mass flow sensor and a proportional control valve. The MFC is fitted with a closed loop control system which is given an input signal by the operator (or an external circuit/computer) that it compares to the value from the mass flow sensor and adjusts the proportional valve accordingly to achieve the required flow. The flow rate is specified as a percentage of its calibrated full scale flow and is supplied to the MFC as a voltage signal.

Mass flow controllers require the supply gas or liquid to be within a specific pressure range. Low pressure will starve the MFC of fluid and cause it to fail to achieve its setpoint. High pressure may cause erratic flow rates. There are many different technologies which can help to measure the flow of the fluids and eventually help in controlling flow. Those technologies define the types of Mass Flow Controllers, and they include differential pressure (ΔP), differential temperature (ΔT), Coriolis, Ultrasonic, electromagnetic, turbine, etc.

== See also ==
- Control valve
- Coriolis
- Flow control valve
- Flow limiter
- Flow measurement
- Mass flow meter
- Thermal mass flow meter
- Mass flow rate
