= Discharge coefficient =

In a nozzle or other constriction, the discharge coefficient (also known as coefficient of discharge or efflux coefficient) is the ratio of the actual discharge to the ideal discharge, i.e., the ratio of the mass flow rate at the discharge end of the nozzle to that of an ideal nozzle which expands an identical working fluid from the same initial conditions to the same exit pressures.

Mathematically the discharge coefficient may be related to the mass flow rate of a fluid through a straight tube of constant cross-sectional area through the following:

$$C_\text{d} = \frac{\dot{m}}{\rho\dot{V}} = \frac{\dot{m}}{\rho Au} = \frac{\dot{m}}{\rho A \sqrt{\frac{2\Delta P}{\rho}}} = \frac{\dot{m}}{A \sqrt{2\rho\Delta P}}$$
$$C_\text{d} = \frac{Q_\text{exp}}{Q_\text{ideal}}$$

Where:

$C_\text{d}$, discharge coefficient through the constriction (dimensionless).
$\dot{m}$, mass flow rate of fluid through constriction (mass per time).
$\rho$, density of fluid (mass per volume).
$\dot{V}$, volumetric flow rate of fluid through constriction (volume per time).
$A$, cross-sectional area of flow constriction (area).
$u$ , velocity of fluid through constriction (length per time).
$\Delta P$, pressure drop across constriction (force per area).

This parameter is useful for determining the irrecoverable losses associated with a certain piece of equipment (constriction) in a fluid system, or the "resistance" that piece of equipment imposes upon the flow.

This flow resistance, often expressed as a dimensionless parameter, $k$, is related to the discharge coefficient through the equation:

$$k = \frac{1}{C_\text{d}^2}$$

which may be obtained by substituting $\Delta P$ in the aforementioned equation with the resistance, $k$, multiplied by the dynamic pressure of the fluid, $q$.

It is very common in engineering to specify the $C_\text{d} A$ as an inherent property of an orifice or other restriction, rather than a flow resistance:

$C_\text{d} A = \frac{\dot{m}}{\sqrt{2\rho\Delta P}}$

== An example in open channel flow ==
Due to complex behavior of fluids around some of the structures such as orifices, gates, and weirs etc., some assumptions are made for the theoretical analysis of the stage-discharge relationship. For example, in case of gates, the pressure at the gate opening is non-hydrostatic which is difficult to model; however, it is known that the pressure at the gate is very small. Therefore, engineers assume that the pressure is zero at the gate opening and following equation is obtained for discharge:

$$Q = A_0\sqrt{2gH_1}$$

where:

Q, discharge
$A_0$, area of flow
g, acceleration due to gravity
$H_1$, head just upstream of the gate

However, the pressure is not actually zero at the gate; therefore, discharge coefficient, C_{d} is used as follows:

$$Q = C_\text{d} A_0\sqrt{2gH_1}$$

== See also ==
- Flow coefficient
- Orifice plate
