= Level control valve =

Automatic control valve resonding to fluid level

A level control valve or altitude control valve is a type of valve that automatically responds to changes in the height of a liquid in some storage system. A common example is the set of ballcocks in a flush toilet, where each stage of the flush cycle is actuated by the emptying or filling of the tank. Another example is in reservoirs and other tank storage systems, where the tank is refilled from another source when the tank runs low and overfilling is prevented as it refills. In all cases, the valve itself is attached to a sensor, such as a float switch or similar system where float attached to the desired length of cable, or a spring whose strength is calibrated for the desired head pressure. They can be modulating, where the flow is proportional to the difference between the actual depth and the desired set-point, or non-modulating, where the valve is either open or closed.
