= Dry gas =

Alcohol-based additive gas

Dry gas is an alcohol-based additive gas used in automobiles to prevent water from freezing in water-contaminated fuels, thereby restoring the combustive power of gasoline spoiled by water. Dry gas is added to the fuel tank and binds to the water to burn it off, and typically contains either methanol or isopropyl alcohol.

== Ethanol as a replacement for dry gas ==
Most gasoline now contains approximately 10–15% ethanol solution. Current gasoline-powered automobiles can safely run with up to a 10% ethanol solution without requiring any modification. However, when the ethanol content reaches 15% or higher, older vehicles need to replace their fuel lines to prevent degradation and rupture. In this case, the electric fuel pump may also need modification to prevent ethanol "dry rot".

It is mostly true that dry gas is no longer needed due to the ethanol added to modern fuels, as ethanol is a drying agent that has an affinity for water present in the atmosphere. It binds to the fuel tank's moisture, reducing freezing in fuel lines. Adding dry gas lowers the freezing point of the water and alcohol mixture further than what the ethanol in fuel can produce, causing fuel lines to become more freeze resistant.
