= Flow computer =

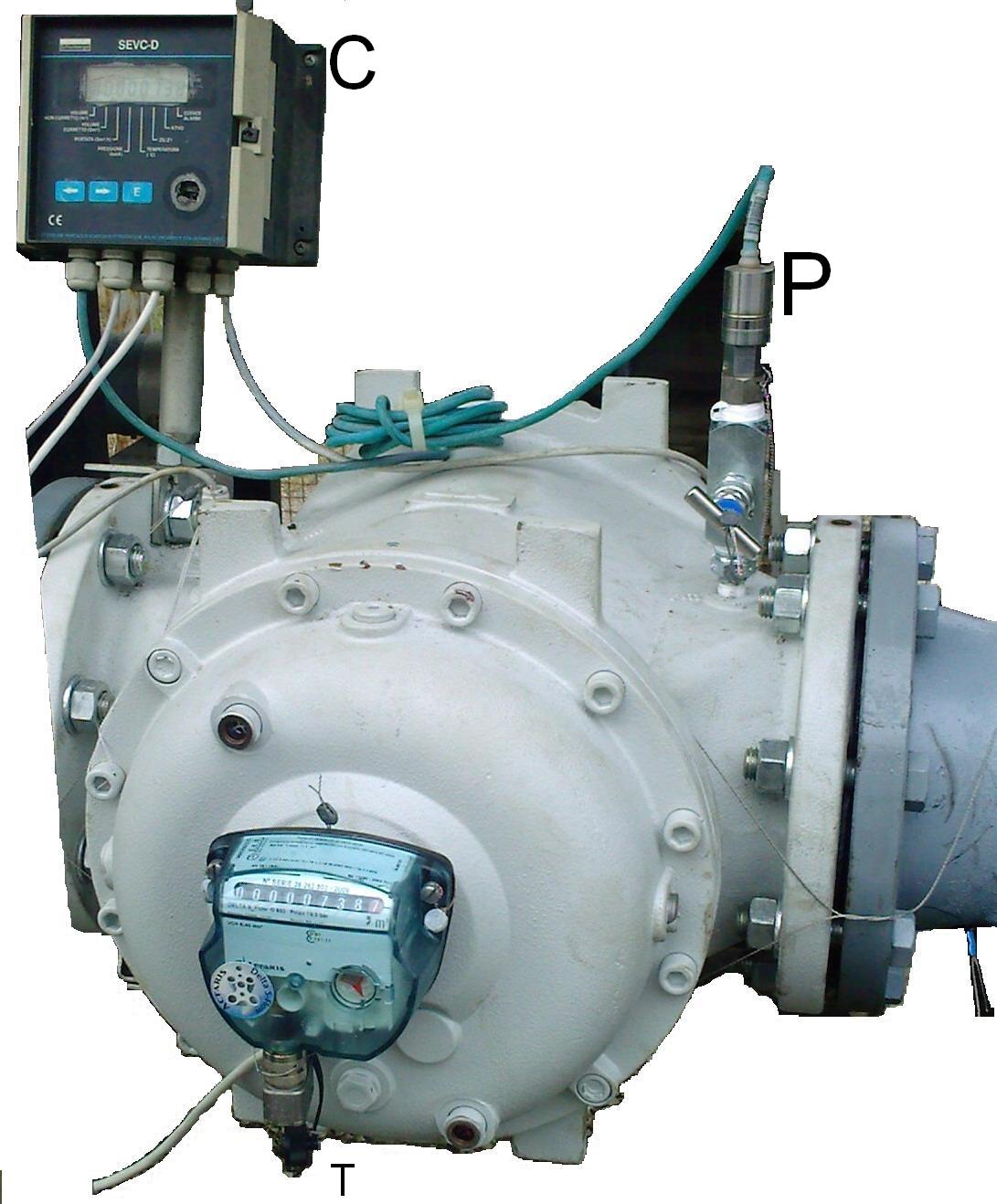
Rotary gas meter with (T) pulse emitter (P) pressure transducer (C) flow computer

A flow computer is an electronic computer which implements algorithms using the analog and digital signals received from flow meters, temperature, pressure and density transmitters to which it is connected into volumes at base conditions. They are used for custody or fiscal transfer.

It also audits changes that have been made to any of the parameters required to turn the raw flow meter data into volumes. It records events and alarms related to the flow meter (for example, loss of flow, loss of required electrical signals from measurement transducers, or transition of these electrical signals near their upper or lower range). It keeps a running tally of the volume for each flow meter it monitors and creates a record of this volume on an hourly, daily, batch or monthly basis. The flow data is made available externally through an electronic interface so that other computers can download the information for supervision, accounting and auditing.

== See also ==
American Petroleum Institute (API) MPMS (Manual of Petroleum Measurement Standards) Chapter 21—Chapters 21.1 - Electronic Gas Systems, and Chapter 21.2 - Liquid Electronic Systems address the ability to audit and verify the information produced by a flow computer, and defines the data which a flow computer should retain, the items which should be audited if modified, the reports which the system will be capable of producing and the methodologies to follow.

Algorithms one can expect to see implemented in a typical gas flow computer are AGA Report No. 3, AGA Report No. 7, AGA Report No. 8 in the U.S. market. Internationally, ISO 5167-1:2003 and other ISO gas standard equivalents are in widespread use. Additional to natural gas, some flow computers offer an array of density calculations for steam, oxygen, hydrogen, nitrogen, and ethylene. Complex algorithms and Equations of State for wide ranges of hydrocarbon fluids and petrochemicals can also be found in liquid flow computers. API MPMS Chapter 11.1 (2004), NIST 1045 and IUPAC for ethylene measurement, GPA TP-27 for LPGs and NGLs are amongst an array of calculations performed by liquid flow computers. Other corrections specific to particular types or manufacturers of flow meters may also be implemented. Flow computers can include meter viscosity linearization functions for various meter types such as helical turbine meters, and interface serially with ultrasonic meters to obtain flow and diagnostic data.

Flow computers are available as completely programmable devices using a variety of software tools or as configurable devices using manufacturer's specific configuration software packages to set up interfaces to gas chromatographs, gas ultrasonic meters, liquid provers, flow control valves, PLC, DCS, SCADA and industry-recognized HMI supervisory systems. Modbus/TCP is a standard offering via Ethernet interfaces from some flow computers, although other communications protocols, such as OLE are supported by some flow computers. Security issues are very significant in SCADA system development using flow computers.

A key component in custody transfer systems, flow computers can be approved to metrological and quality standards such as OIML R117-1 for liquids, EN12405 for gas, WELMEC 7.2 for software development, and ISO 9001:2008. These are considered key selection criteria for flow computers that are installed in Europe, Middle East, Asia and also Latin America.
