= Base conditions =

Base conditions, also known as standard conditions, consist of a specified absolute pressure and temperature. To ensure accuracy, it is important to refer to base conditions when measuring the volume of a sample of liquid or gas. This applies to both static measurement and flow measurement.

== Pressure and temperature ==
The density of both gases and liquids depends on the pressure and temperature of the fluid. Thus volumes measured in cold conditions or in pressurised conditions will be lower than the same mass of fluid at warmer or depressurised conditions. This fact gives rise to the necessity of choosing a benchmark pressure and temperature in which all 'net' volumes will be expressed.

== Ideal gas law ==
The density of a gas at a specific pressure can be estimated by using the ideal gas law. Doubling absolute pressure doubles the density of a gas, and doubling absolute temperature halves the density. The number of molecules in a given gas volume depends on the pressure and temperature. This is why the pressure and temperature must be stated in order for a volume measurement to mean anything.

== Density correction ==
Density correction is also performed on liquids under measurement. For instance, the sticker on gasoline pumps that states that the volume is corrected to 15 °C (59 °F, or 60 °F in the U.S.) means that the measured volume has been compensated for thermal expansion. One would otherwise get a larger mass of gasoline in a tank filled in cold weather (which is unfair to the business) and less when it is warm (which is unfair to the consumer).

            UPDATE

Gas at a filling station is stored underground and is therefore at a constant temperature. The outside temperature has no bearing on this constant ground temperature and therefore the pumped fuel will always be at that temperature and needs not be corrected to 15 degrees but measured at the ground temperature.

Ground gets warmer and cooler with varying temperatures. You'd have to dig down pretty deep to keep it constant.

== Legal definitions ==
Legal regulations usually require that sales to end customers be compensated to the legally defined base conditions. Where regulations do not require the use of a specific set of base conditions, contractual partners may be free to choose their own base conditions.

Base conditions are often defined jurisdictionally. For example:

=== Canada ===
Pressure 101.325 kPa absolute, temperature 15 °C

=== United States ===
Pressure 14.696 psi absolute, temperature 60 °F

=== Mexico ===
Pressure 1 kgf/cm² (equivalent to 98.1 kPa absolute), temperature 20 °C

== Flow computers ==
Flow computers generally need the base conditions for each flow meter to be configured.

== See also ==
- Standard conditions
- Flowing conditions
