= Thermal mass flow meter =

Family of instruments for the measurement of the total mass flow rate of a fluid

Temperature at the sensors varies depending upon the mass flow

Thermal mass flow meters, also known as thermal dispersion or immersible mass flow meters, comprise a family of instruments for the measurement of the total mass flow rate of a fluid, primarily gases, flowing through closed conduits. Thermal mass flow meters measure fluid mass flow rate indirectly by measuring the difference in temperature before and after a heating element. The difference in temperature measurements will vary proportionally to the mass flow rate of the fluid because of convection. Many mass flow controllers (MFC) which combine a mass flow meter, electronics and a valve are based on this design.

In the case of the thermal dispersion, or immersible, type of flow meter, the heat is transferred to the boundary layer of the fluid flowing over the heated surface. In the case of the capillary-tube type, the heat is transferred to the bulk of the fluid flowing through a small heated capillary tube. The principles of operation of the two types are both thermal in nature, but are so substantially different that two separate standards are required. Additionally, their applications are much different. Thermal dispersion flow meters are commonly used for general industrial gas flow applications in pipes and ducts, whereas capillary types are primarily used for smaller flows of clean gases or liquids in tubes. This type is most widely used for thermal mass flow meters in industry. Nevertheless, the capillary type is not the subject of this discussion.

== Thermal dispersion mass flow meter history ==
The operation of thermal dispersion mass flow meters is attributed to L.V. King who, in 1914, published his famous King's Law revealing how a heated wire immersed in a fluid flow measures the mass velocity at a point in the flow. King called his instrument a "hot-wire anemometer". However, it was not until the 1960s and 1970s that industrial-grade thermal dispersion mass flow meters finally emerged.

== Industrial applications ==
The primary reason thermal mass flow meters are popular in industrial applications is the way they are designed and built. They feature no moving parts, nearly unobstructed straight through flow path, require no temperature or pressure corrections and retain accuracy over a wide range of flow rates. Straight pipe runs can be reduced by using dual-plate flow conditioning elements. Thermal mass flow meters are typically used in low flow conditions because the amount of heat required for an effective measurement is proportional to flow rate.

However, in many applications, the thermal properties of the fluid can be dependent upon fluid composition. In such applications, varying composition of the fluid during actual operation can affect the thermal flow measurement. Therefore, it is important for the thermal flow meter supplier to know the composition of the fluid so that the proper calibration factor can be used to determine the flow rate accurately. Suppliers can provide appropriate calibration information for other gas mixtures, however the accuracy of the thermal flow meter is dependent on the actual gas mixture being the same as the gas mixture used for calibration purposes. In other words, the accuracy of a thermal flow meter calibrated for a given gas mixture will be degraded if the actual flowing gas has a different composition.
