= Custody transfer =

Oil and gas industry term for transfer of physical substance from one operator to another

Custody transfer in the oil and gas industry refers to the transactions involving the handover of a physical substance from one operator to another. This includes the transferring of raw and refined petroleum between tanks and railway tank cars; onto ships, and other transactions. Custody transfer in fluid measurement is defined as a metering point (location) where the fluid is being measured for sale from one party to another. During custody transfer, accuracy is of great importance to both the company delivering the material and the eventual recipient, when transferring a material.

The term "fiscal metering" is often interchanged with custody transfer, and refers to metering that is a point of a commercial transaction such as when a change in ownership takes place. Custody transfer takes place any time fluids are passed from the possession of one party to another. The use of the phrase "fiscal metering" does not necessary imply any single expectation of the quality of the instrumentation to be installed. "Fiscal" refers to the meter's service, not its quality. "Fiscal" usually means ‘concerned with government finance’.

Custody transfer generally involves:

- Industry standards;
- National metrology standards;
- Contractual agreements between custody transfer parties; and
- Government regulation and taxation.

Due to the high level of accuracy required during custody transfer applications, the flowmeters which are used to perform this are subject to approval by an organization such as the American Petroleum Institute (API). Custody transfer operations can occur at a number of points along the way; these may include operations, transactions or transferring of oil from an oil production platform to a ship, barge, railcar, truck and also to the final destination point, such as a refinery.

To complete standards and/or agreements and achieve maximum accuracy all parties included in fuel distribution processes (sellers and buyers, transport & storage services, fiscal departments) must follow the custody transfer procedures, appropriate measurements and related documenting operations must be fully implemented. Custody transfer measurements involve measurements in pipelines, storage tanks, transportation tanks (tankers, trailers or railway tanks) - whole fuel distribution process must be traceable. In order measurements can be made in a volume or mass units (or both), so various metering methods are commonly used.

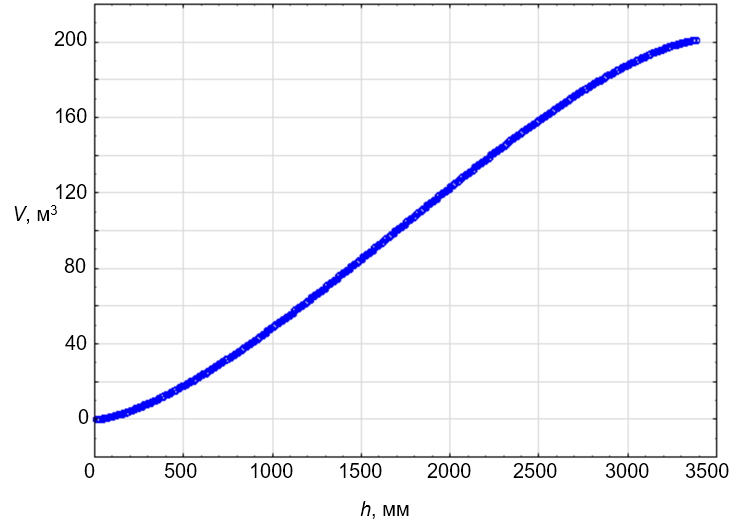
Capacity table for horizontal cylindrical storage tank

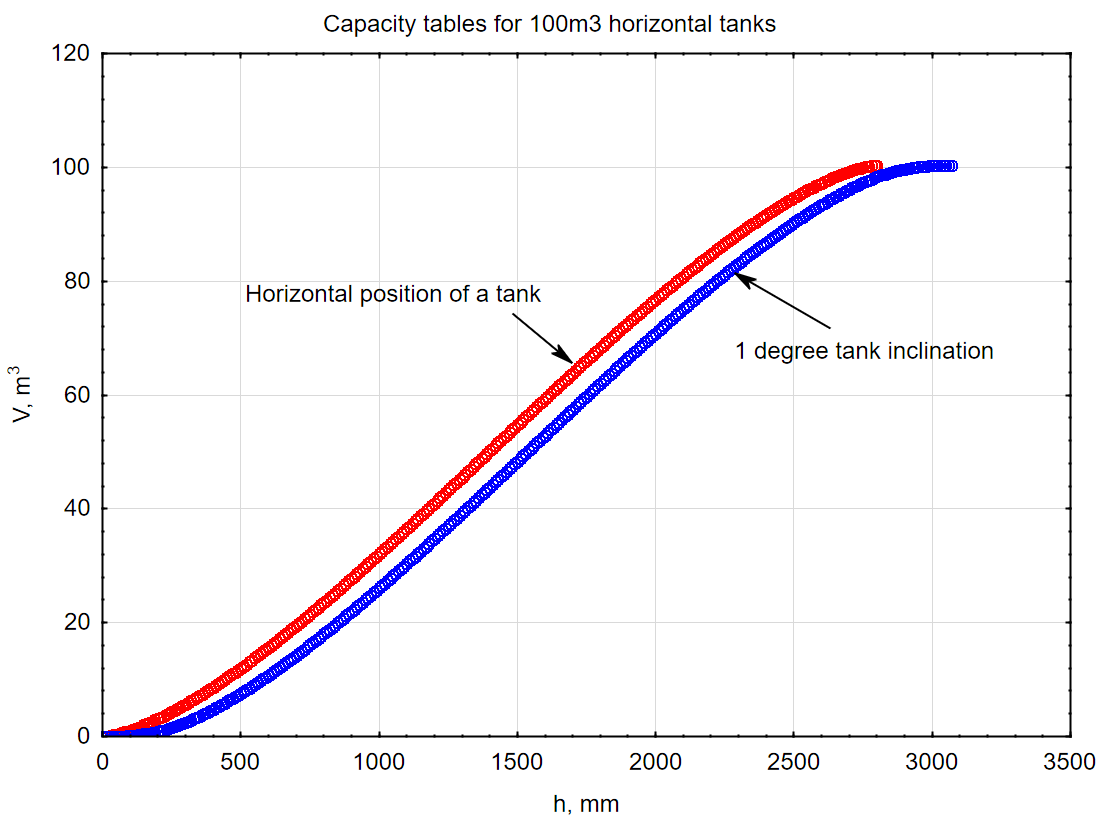
Capacity tables and its changes due to inclination of a tank

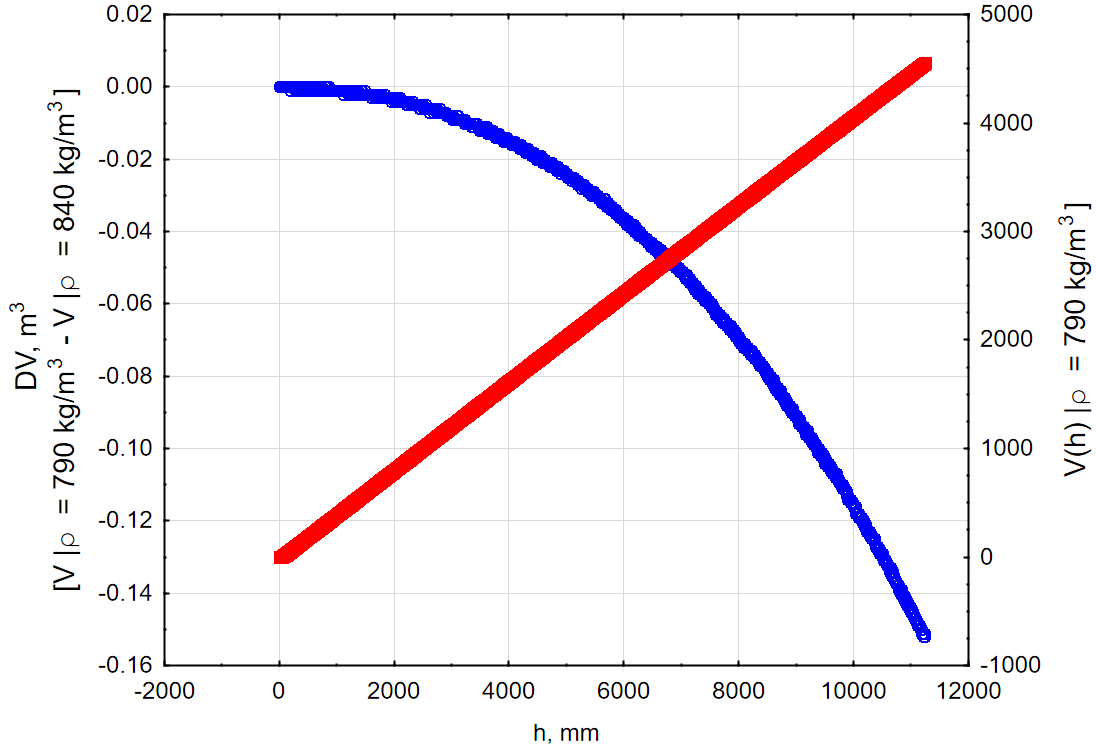
Demonstration of a volume table for vertical cylindrical tank and the difference for capacity table for various densities

Current volume of a product stored in a tank can be calculated using a tank capacity table (sometimes called "tank calibration table") and current levels and temperatures of a product in a tank. Tank capacity table stores data about level and appropriate volume in a tank and have a very high impact on overall accuracy of volume calculation. Typical accuracy of a capacity tables for custody transfer operations is 0.05..0.1%. Initial installation of a tank, its accuracy and lifecycle changes (like inclination or sediments) affect the accuracy of the capacity table so they must be revised periodically. Some capacity tables are multidimensional and store additional data - like heel and trim for ships tanks density of stored products and/or are used in systems for automated volume/mass calculations.

== Metering methods ==
Custody transfer is one of the most important applications for flow measurement. Many flow measurement technologies are used for custody transfer applications; these include differential pressure (DP) flowmeters, turbine flowmeters, positive displacement flowmeters, Coriolis flowmeters and ultrasonic flowmeters.

=== Differential pressure flowmeters ===
Differential pressure (DP) flowmeters determine flow rate from the pressure difference produced by a primary flow element installed in the pipeline. They are used for measuring liquids, gases and steam, including applications involving custody transfer.

A typical DP flow measurement system consists of a primary element, such as an orifice plate, Venturi tube or flow nozzle, together with a differential pressure transmitter. The primary element creates a controlled change in the flow velocity and pressure. The transmitter measures the differential pressure between pressure taps located upstream and downstream of the primary element. Under defined flow conditions, the differential pressure can be related to the flow rate.

For an idealized incompressible flow, the relationship between differential pressure and flow rate is approximately proportional to the square of the flow rate. Consequently, the flow rate is commonly calculated from the measured differential pressure together with parameters such as fluid density, pressure, temperature, and the geometry of the primary element.

DP flowmeters require the primary element and associated pressure-measurement system to be selected and installed according to the applicable design and measurement requirements. The performance of the complete system can be affected by factors including pipe geometry, upstream flow disturbances, pressure-tap configuration, fluid properties, impulse-line conditions and transmitter accuracy.

For custody-transfer applications, differential-pressure flow measurement is covered by industry standards and recommended practices, including ISO 5167 for differential-pressure devices and relevant documents published by the American Petroleum Institute (API) and American Gas Association (AGA), depending on the fluid and application.

A principal advantage of DP flowmeters is the extensive body of engineering data, standards and operating experience associated with differential-pressure measurement. Orifice plates and other primary elements can also be relatively simple to inspect, replace and characterize.

A limitation is the permanent pressure loss introduced by the primary element. The magnitude of this loss depends on the type and geometry of the element and the operating conditions. This pressure loss can increase the energy required to transport the fluid through the system.

For gas and liquid measurement, DP systems may be combined with pressure and temperature measurements and fluid-property calculations to determine flow at specified reference conditions. In natural-gas applications, flow computers may also perform the required compensation and calculation functions.

Orifice fittings are commonly used where an orifice plate must be removed or inspected without major disassembly of the pipeline. Single-chamber and dual-chamber designs allow the plate to be accessed while reducing the amount of pipeline disassembly required, subject to the design and operating procedure of the installation.

=== Turbine flowmeters ===
The first turbine flowmeter was invented by Reinhard Woltman, a German engineer in 1790. Turbine flowmeters consist of a rotor with propeller-like blades that spins as water or some other fluid passes over it. The rotor spins in proportion to flow rate (see turbine meters) . There are many types of turbine meters, but many of those used for gas flow are called axial meters.

The turbine flowmeter is most useful when measuring clean, steady, high-speed flow of low-viscosity fluids. In comparison to other flowmeters, the turbine flowmeter has a significant cost advantage over ultrasonic flowmeters, especially in the larger line sizes, and it also has a favourable price compared to the prices of DP flowmeters, especially in cases where one turbine meter can replace several DP meters.

The disadvantage of turbine flowmeters is that they have moving parts that are subject to wear. To prevent wear and inaccuracy, durable materials are used, including ceramic ball bearings.

=== Positive displacement flowmeters ===
Positive displacement (PD) flowmeters are highly accurate meters that are widely used for custody transfer of commercial and industrial water, as well as for custody transfer of many other liquids. PD flowmeters have the advantage that they have been approved by a number of regulatory bodies for this purpose, and they have not yet been displaced by other applications.

PD meters excel at measuring low flows, and also at measuring highly viscous flows, because PD meters captures the flow in a container of known volume. Speed of flow doesn't matter when using a PD meter.

=== Coriolis flowmeters ===
Coriolis flowmeters have been around for more than 30 years and are preferred in process industries such as chemical and food and beverage. Coriolis technology offers accuracy and reliability in measuring material flow, and is often considered among the best flow measurement technologies due to direct mass flow, fluid density, temperature, and precise calculated volume flow rates. Coriolis meters do not have any moving parts and provide long term stability, repeatability, and reliability. Because they are direct mass flow measurement devices, Coriolis meters can handle the widest range of fluids from gases to heavy liquids and are not impacted by viscosity or density changes that often affect velocity based technologies (PD, turbine, ultrasonic). With the widest flow range capability of any flow technology, Coriolis can be sized for low pressure drop. This combined with the fact that they are not flow profile dependent helps eliminate the need for straight runs and flow conditioning which enables custody transfer systems to be designed with minimal pressure drop.

Any measurement instrument that relies on one measurement principle only will show a higher measurement uncertainty under two-phase flow conditions. Conventional measurement principles, like positive displacement, turbine meters, orifice plates will seemingly continue to measure, but will not be able to inform the user about the occurrence of two-phase flow. Modern principles based on the Coriolis effect or ultrasonic flow measurement will inform the user by means of diagnostic functions.

Flow is measured using Coriolis meters by analyzing the changes in the Coriolis force of a flowing substance. The force is generated in a mass moving within a rotating frame of reference. An angular, outward acceleration, which is factored with linear velocity is produced due to the rotation. With a fluid mass, the Coriolis force is proportional to the mass flow rate of that fluid.

A Coriolis meter has two main components: an oscillating flow tube equipped with sensors and drivers, and an electronic transmitter that controls the oscillations, analyzes the results, and transmits the information. The Coriolis principle for flow measurement requires the oscillating section of a rotating pipe to be exploited. Oscillation produces the Coriolis force, which traditionally is sensed and analyzed to determine the rate of flow. Modern coriolis meters utilize the phase difference measured at each end of the oscillating pipe.

=== Ultrasonic flowmeters ===
Ultrasonic flowmeters measure fluid velocity using ultrasonic acoustic signals and can be used to determine volumetric flow rate. Several measurement principles are used, including transit-time and Doppler methods. Transit-time meters determine fluid velocity from the difference in the time taken by acoustic pulses to travel upstream and downstream through the flowing fluid. Multipath designs use several acoustic paths to obtain velocity information at different locations across the pipe.

Ultrasonic flowmeters are available as inline and clamp-on instruments. Inline transit-time meters are installed in the pipeline, while clamp-on meters mount transducers on the outside of the pipe and can measure flow without cutting into the process line. The suitability of a particular ultrasonic meter depends on factors including fluid properties, pipe geometry, flow profile, acoustic conditions and the required measurement uncertainty.

Because ultrasonic flowmeters have no mechanical components in the flow path, they generally introduce little permanent pressure loss compared with flowmeters that use an obstruction or moving mechanical element. Multipath ultrasonic meters can also provide diagnostic information that can be used to assess measurement conditions and changes in flow profile.

Ultrasonic flowmeters are used in applications including water and wastewater measurement, industrial process measurement, energy management, hydrocarbon measurement and custody transfer metering. In natural-gas applications, multipath transit-time ultrasonic meters are used for production, transmission, storage, distribution and other gas-measurement applications. AGA Report No. 9 provides industry guidance for multipath ultrasonic transit-time meters used to measure natural gas, including requirements relating to meter performance, installation, calibration, verification and diagnostics.

ISO 17089-1 specifies requirements and recommendations for transit-time ultrasonic gas flowmeters used for custody-transfer and allocation measurement. The standard covers meter construction and performance, calibration, diagnostics, output characteristics and installation conditions.

For custody-transfer applications, meter performance is only one part of the measurement system. Installation conditions, flow conditioning, pressure and temperature measurement, fluid-property calculations, calibration and uncertainty assessment can all affect the resulting measurement. Consequently, ultrasonic meters used for commercial measurement are commonly evaluated as part of a complete metering system rather than as an isolated instrument.

== Components ==
Custody transfer requires an entire metering system that is designed and engineered for the application, not just flowmeters. Components of a custody transfer system typically include:

- Multiple meters/meter runs;
- Flow computers;
- Quality systems (gas chromatographs to measure energy content of natural gas and sampling systems for liquid);
- Calibration using in-place or mobile provers for liquid, or master-meter for liquid or gas; and
- Supporting automation.

A typical liquid custody transfer skid includes multiple flowmeters and meter provers. Provers are used to calibrate meters in-situ and are performed frequently; typically before, during, and after a batch transfer for metering assurance. A good example of this is a Lease Automatic Custody Transfer (LACT) unit in a crude oil production facility.

== Accuracy ==
In the ISO 5725-1 standard accuracy for measuring instruments is defined as “the closeness of agreement between a test result and the accepted reference value”. This term “accuracy” includes both the systematic error and the bias component. Each device has its manufacturer stated accuracy specification and its tested accuracy. Uncertainty takes all the metering system factors that impact measurement accuracy into account. The accuracy of flowmeters could be used in two different metering systems that ultimately have different calculated uncertainties due to other factors in the system that affect flow calculations. Uncertainty even includes such factors as the flow computer's A/D converter accuracy. The quest for accuracy in a custody transfer system requires meticulous attention to detail.

== Custody transfer requirements ==
Custody transfer metering systems must meet requirements set by industry bodies such as AGA, API, or ISO, and national metrology standards such as OIML (International), NIST (U.S.), PTB (Germany), CMC (China), and GOST (Russia), DSTU (Ukraine) among others. These requirements can be of two types: legal and contract.

=== Legal ===
The national Weights & Measures codes and regulations control the wholesale and retail trade requirements to facilitate fair trade. The regulations and accuracy requirements vary widely between countries and commodities, but they all have one common characteristic, traceability. There is always a procedure that defines the validation process where the duty meter is compared to a standard that is traceable to the legal metrology agency of the respective region.

=== Contract ===
A contract is a written agreement between buyers and sellers that defines the measurement requirements. These are large-volume sales between operating companies where refined products and crude oils are transported by marine, pipeline or rail. Custody transfer measurement must be at the highest level of accuracy possible because a small error in measurement can amount to a large financial difference. Due to these critical natures of measurements, petroleum companies around the world have developed and adopted standards to meet the industry's needs.

In Canada, for instance, all measurement of a custody transfer nature falls under the purview of Measurement Canada. In the US, the Federal Energy Regulatory Commission (FERC) controls the standards which must be met for interstate trade.

== Liquid custody transfer ==
Custody transfer of liquid flow measurement follow guidelines set by the ISO. By industrial consensus, liquid flow measurement is defined as having an overall uncertainty of ±0.25% or better. The overall uncertainty is derived from an appropriate statistical combination of the component uncertainties in the measurement system.

=== Mode of measurement ===
==== Volume or mass measurement ====
Liquid flow may be measured and reported as either volumetric flow rate or mass flow rate. The appropriate basis depends on the properties of the fluid, the measurement technology, operating conditions, and the requirements of the measurement or allocation system.

Volumetric measurement determines the quantity of liquid passing through a meter over a specified period. Common technologies include turbine, ultrasonic, positive displacement, and Coriolis flowmeters. Volumetric measurements may be corrected for temperature and pressure where required to express the quantity at a specified reference condition.

Mass flow can be determined either directly or indirectly. Indirect mass measurement combines a measured volumetric flow rate with a measurement or calculation of fluid density:

Mass flow rate = volumetric flow rate × density

A Coriolis flow meter measures mass flow directly from the motion of the flowing fluid within vibrating measurement tubes and can also provide measurements of fluid density.

In liquid hydrocarbon measurement, the selected measurement basis can affect allocation, inventory accounting and custody transfer calculations. Where volume is converted to a reference temperature or pressure, accurate measurement of temperature, pressure and fluid properties is required in addition to the primary flow measurement.

==== Sampling system ====
An automatic flow-proportional sampling system is used in flow measurement to determine the average water content, average density and for analysis purposes. Sampling systems should be broadly in accordance with ISO 3171. The sampling system is a critical section during flow measurement. Any errors introduced through sampling error will generally have a direct, linear effect on the overall measurement.

==== Temperature and pressure measurement ====
Temperature and pressure measurement are important factors to consider when taking flow measurements of liquids. Temperature and pressure measurement points should be situated as close to the meter as possible, in reference to their conditions at the meter inlet. Temperature measurements that affect the accuracy of the metering system should have an overall loop accuracy of 0.5 °C or better, and the corresponding readout should have a resolution of 0.2 °C or better.

Temperature checks are performed by certified thermometers with the aid of thermowells.

Pressure measurements that affect the accuracy of the metering system should have an overall loop accuracy of 0.5 bar or better and the corresponding readout should have a resolution of 0.1 bar or better.

== Gaseous custody transfer ==
Custody transfer of gaseous flow measurement follow guidelines set by the international bodies. By industrial consensus, gaseous flow measurement is defined as mass flow measurement with an overall uncertainty of ±1.0% or better. The overall uncertainty is derived from an appropriate statistical combination of the component uncertainties in the measurement system.

=== Mode of measurement ===
==== Volume or mass unit ====
All gaseous flow measurement must be made on single-phase gas streams, having measurements in either volumetric or mass units.

==== Sampling ====
Sampling is an important aspect, as they help to ascertain accuracy. Apt facilities should be provided for the purpose of obtaining representative samples. The type of instrumentation and the measuring system may influence this requirement.

==== Gas density ====
Gas density at the meter may be determined either by:

- Continuous direct measurement, by on-line densitometer
- Calculation, using a recognised equation of state together with measurements of the gas temperature, pressure and composition.

Most industries prefer to use the continuous measurement of gas density. However, both methods may be used simultaneously, and the comparison of their respective results may provide additional confidence in the accuracy of each method.

== Best practices ==
In any custody transfer application, a true random uncertainty has an equal chance of favouring either party, the net impact should be zero to both parties, and measurement accuracy and repeatability should not be valued. Measurement accuracy and repeatability are of high value to most seller because many users install check meters. The first step in designing any custody transfer system is to determine the mutual measurement performance expectations of the supplier and the user over the range of flow rates. This determination of mutual performance expectations should be made by individuals who have a clear understanding of all of the costs of measurement disputes caused by poor repeatability. The second step is to quantify the operating conditions which are not controllable. For a flow measurement, these can include:

- Expected ambient temperature variation;
- Maximum static line pressure;
- Static line pressure and temperature variation;
- Maximum allowable permanent pressure loss;
- Flow turndown; and
- Expected frequency of flow variation and/or pulsation.

The third and final step is to select hardware, installation and maintenance procedures which will ensure that the measurement provides the required installed performance under the expected (uncontrollable) operating conditions. For example, the user can:

- Select a static and/or differential pressure transmitter which has better or worse performance under the given real-world operating conditions.
- Calibrate the transmitter(s) frequently or infrequently.
- In the case of a DP flowmeter, size the primary element for a higher or lower differential pressure (higher DP's provide higher accuracy, at the expense of higher pressure loss).
- Select a flowmeter and pressure transmitter with faster or slower response.
- Use long or short interconnection (impulse) lines, or direct connect for fastest response.

While the first and second steps involve gathering data, the third step may require calculations and/or testing.

== General formula for calculating energy transferred (LNG) ==
The formula for calculating the LNG transferred depends on the contractual sales conditions. These can relate to three types of sale contract as defined by Incoterms 2000: an FOB sale, a CIF sale or a DES sale.

In the case of an FOB (Free On Board) sale, the determination of the energy transferred and invoiced for will be made in the loading port.

In the case of a CIF (Cost Insurance & Freight) or a DES (Delivered Ex Ship) sale, the energy transferred and invoiced for will be determined in the unloading port.

In FOB contracts, the buyer is responsible to provide and maintain the custody transfer measurement systems on board the vessel for volume, temperature and pressure determination and the seller is responsible to provide and maintain the custody transfer measurement systems at the loading terminal such as the sampling and gas analysis. For CIF and DES contracts the responsibility is reversed.

Both buyer and seller have the right to verify the accuracy of each system that is provided, maintained and operated by the other party. The determination of the transferred energy usually happens in the presence of one or more surveyors, the ship's cargo officer and a representative of the LNG terminal operator. A representative of the buyer can also be present.

In all cases, the transferred energy can be calculated with the following formula:

E =(VLNG × DLNG × GVCLNG) - Egas displaced ± Egas to ER (if applicable)

Where:

E = the total net energy transferred from the loading facilities to the LNG carrier, or from the LNG carrier to the unloading facilities.

VLNG= the volume of LNG loaded or unloaded in m3.

DLNG = the density of LNG loaded or unloaded in kg/m3.

GCVLNG = the gross calorific value of the LNG loaded or unloaded in million BTU/kg

E gas displaced = The net energy of the displaced gas, also in million BTU, which is either: sent back onshore by the LNG carrier when loading (volume of gas in cargo tanks displaced by same volume of loaded LNG), Or, gas received by the LNG carrier in its cargo tanks when unloading in replacement of the volume of discharged LNG.

E(gas to ER) = If applicable, the energy of the gas consumed in the LNG carrier's engine room during the time between opening and closing custody transfer surveys, i.e. used by the vessel at the port, which is:

+ For an LNG loading transfer or

- For an LNG unloading transfer

== See also ==
- Heat meter
