= LVDT flow meter =

Meter for measuring the flow rate of a fluid or gas

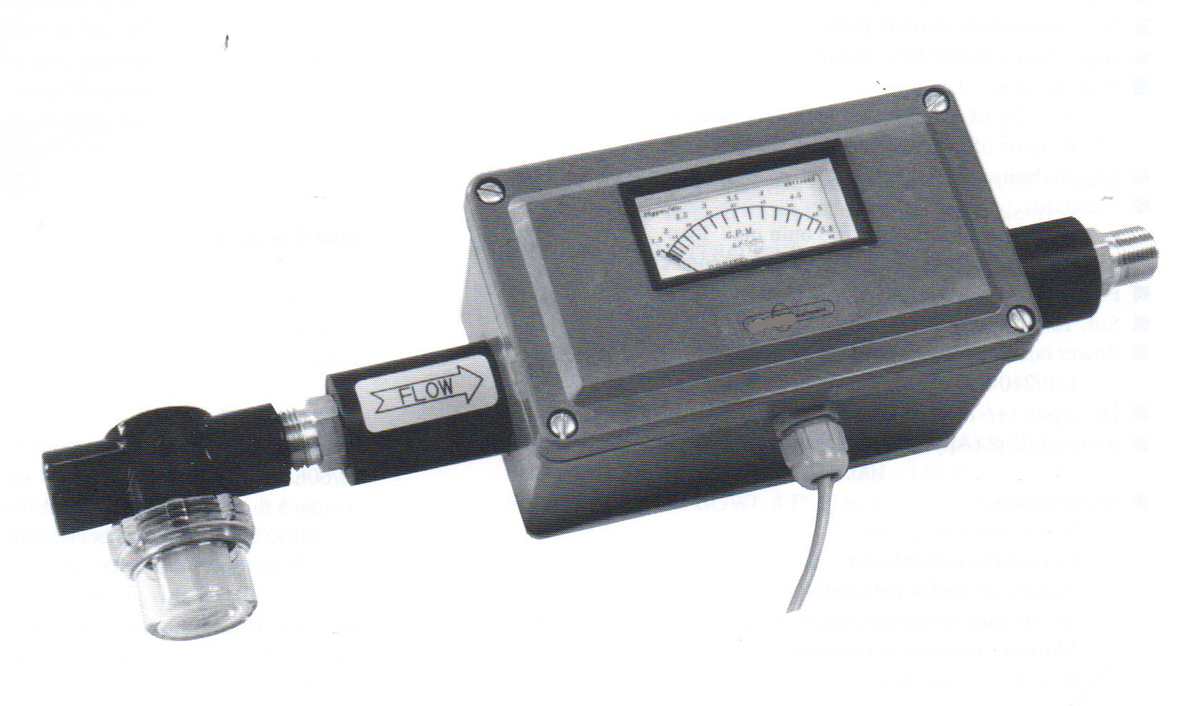
LVDT flow meter

An LVDT (Linear Variable Differential Transformer) Variable Area Rotameter, is a meter designed to measure the flow rate of a fluid or gas.

== Mechanism ==
The flow meter utilizes a unique combination of a tapered metering cone in series with a piston. The position of the metal piston is sensed by the LVDT circuitry and is then translated into a flow rate. This non linear signal can be directly displayed or linearized with an electrical output.

== Benefits ==
Advantages include the ability to externally measure very low flow rates.

== See also ==
- Cyclonic flow meter
