= Positive displacement meter =

Flow meter

A positive displacement meter is a type of flow meter that requires fluid to mechanically displace components in the meter in order for flow measurement. Positive displacement (PD) flow meters measure the volumetric flow rate of a moving fluid or gas by dividing the media into fixed, metered volumes (finite increments or volumes of the fluid). A basic analogy would be holding a bucket below a tap, filling it to a set level, then quickly replacing it with another bucket and timing the rate at which the buckets are filled (or the total number of buckets for the “totalized” flow). With appropriate pressure and temperature compensation, the mass flow rate can be accurately determined.

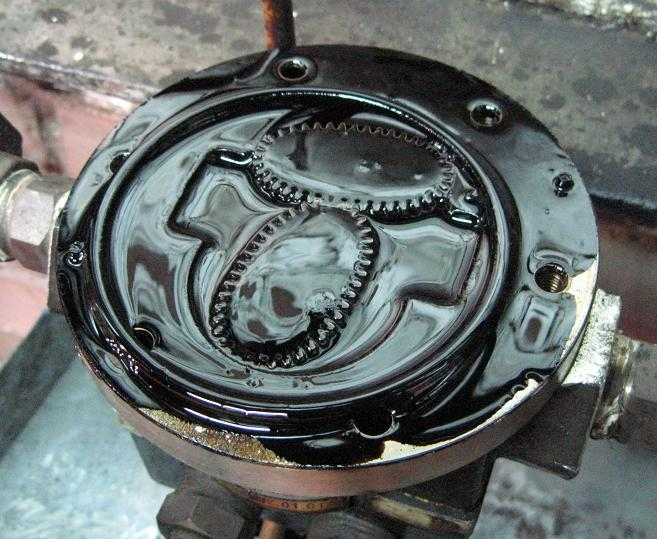
A positive displacement flowmeter of the oval gear type. Fluid forces the meshed gears to rotate; each rotation corresponds to a fixed volume of fluid. Counting the revolutions totalizes volume, and the rate is proportional to flow.

These devices consist of a chamber(s) that obstructs the media flow and a rotating or reciprocating mechanism that allows the passage of fixed-volume amounts. The number of parcels that pass through the chamber determines the media volume. The rate of revolution or reciprocation determines the flow rate. There are two basic types of positive displacement flow meters. Sensor-only systems or transducers are switch-like devices that provide electronic outputs for processors, controllers, or data acquisition systems.

Complete sensor systems provide additional capabilities such as an integral display and/or user interface. For both types of positive displacement flow meters, performance specifications include the minimum and maximum measurable flow rate, operating pressure, temperature range, maximum allowable material viscosity, connection size, and percent accuracy (typically as a percentage of actual reading, not full scale). Suppliers indicate whether devices are designed to measure fluid or gas.

== Types ==
=== Screw meter ===
A screw flowmeter is composed of a set of screws (also called spindles) which form with the internal structure of the flowmeters' casing a measurement chamber. The screw will get into rotation thanks to the medium passing through the device, which will then be transferred by the-said screws from one end to the other end of the measuring device. For this to be done, the pressure drop is essential and seen as a "necessary evil". This rotation can then be recorded by a sensor which, combined with the processing unit (software and hardware), will be able to deliver a measurement according to the flowrate, viscosity and size of the measurement chamber. ft

Screw flowmeters are well-acknowledged for their excellent linearity (±0.001%), excellent repeatability (up to 0,006%) and accuracy (±0.1%). They have the propensity to be used as metrological international reference and/or standard by metrological institutes, due to their outstanding features and reliability. Thanks to screw meters, public and independent institutes of metrology worldwide can compare their respective work, facilities, or calibrate other flowmeters (e.g., master metering) or compare flowmeters' performance according to different measurement principles.

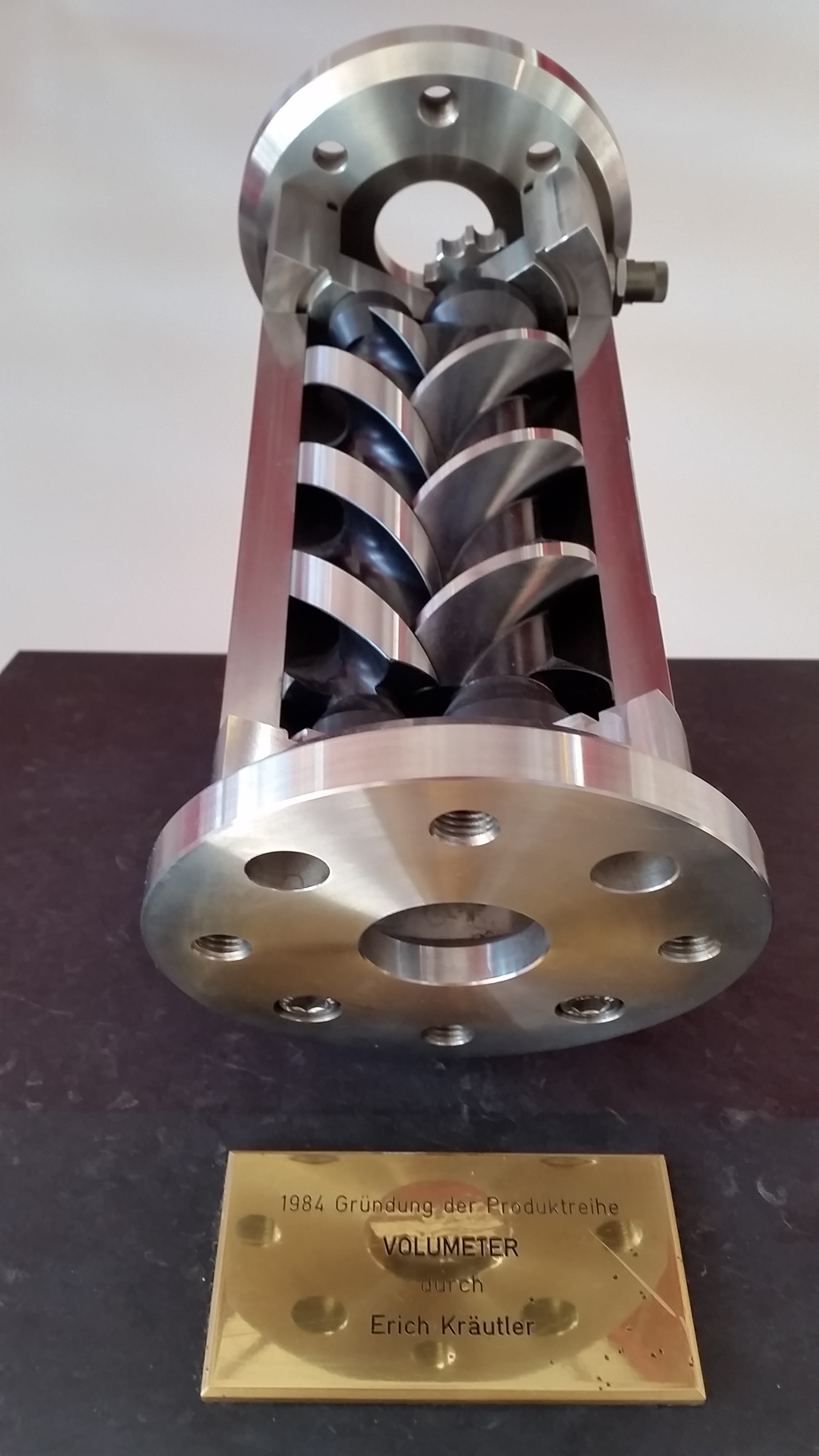
The first positive displacement screw flowmeter. A KRAL flowmeter.

List of public and independent institutes of metrology using screw flow meters as international reference and/or standard:

- Australia
- Austria
- Belgium
- Canada
- Czech Republic
- Denmark
- France
- Germany
- Japan
- Mexico
- Scotland
- Sweden
- Switzerland
- Taiwan R.O.C.
- The Netherlands
- The United Kingdom
- Vietnam

=== Reciprocating or oscillating piston ===
Each piston is mechanically or magnetically operated to fill a cylinder with the fluid and then discharge the fluid. Each stroke represents a finite measurement of the fluid (can be a single or multi-piston device).

=== Gear ===
Gear flow meters rely on internal gears rotating as fluid passes through them. There are various types of gear meters named mostly for the shape of the internal components

Oval gear
Two rotating oval gears with synchronized teeth “squeeze” a finite amount of fluid through the meter for each revolution.

With oval gear flow meters, two oval gears or rotors are mounted inside a cylinder. As the fluid flows through the cylinder, the pressure of the fluid causes the rotors to rotate. As flow rate increases, so does the rotational speed of the rotors.

Helical gear
Helical gear flow meters get their name from the shape of their gears or rotors. These rotors resemble the shape of a helix, which is a spiral-shaped structure. As the fluid flows through the meter, it enters the compartments in the rotors, causing the rotors to rotate. Flowrate is calculated from the speed of rotation.

=== Nutating disk ===
A disk mounted on a sphere is “wobbled” about an axis by the fluid flow and each rotation represents a finite amount of fluid transferred. A nutating disc flow meter has a round disc mounted on a spindle in a cylindrical chamber. By tracking the movements of the spindle, the flow meter determines the number of times the chamber traps and empties fluid. This information is used to determine the flow rate.

=== Rotary vane ===
A rotating impeller containing two or more vanes divides the spaces between the vanes into discrete volumes and each rotation (or vane passing) is counted.

Flow = volume of measuring chamber × RPM × 4

=== Diaphragm ===
Fluid is drawn into the inlet side of an oscillating diaphragm and then dispelled to the outlet. The diaphragm oscillating cycles are counted to determine the flow rate.

== Advantages and considerations ==
Positive displacement flowmeters are very accurate and have high turndown. They can be used in very viscous, dirty and corrosive fluids and essentially require no straight runs of pipe for fluid flow stream conditioning though pressure drop can be an issue. They are widely used in the custody transfer of oils and liquid fluids (gasoline) and are applied on residential home natural gas and water metering. A diaphragm meter, with which most homes are equipped, is an example of a positive displacement meter. This type of meter is appealing in certain custody transfer flow applications where it is critical that the metering be functional in order for any flow to take place.

Positive displacement flowmeters, with internal wiping seals, produce the highest differential pressure (and subsequently greatest pressure drop head loss) of all the flowmeter types. Meters that rely on a liquid seal create a relatively low pressure drop.

Positive-displacement (PD) meters can measure both liquids and gases. Like turbine meters, PD flow meters work best with clean, non-corrosive, and non-erosive liquids and gases, although some models will tolerate some impurities. Because of their high accuracy, PD meters are widely used at residences to measure the amount of gas or water used. Other applications include: chemical injection, fuel measurement, precision test stands, high pressure, hydraulic testing, and similar precision applications.

Some designs require that only lubricating fluid be measured, because the rotors are exposed to the fluid. PD meters differ from turbine meters in that they handle medium and high-viscosity liquids well. For this reason, they are often used to measure the flow of hydraulic fluids. Compared with orifice-type meters, PD meters require very little straight upstream piping since they are not sensitive to uneven flow distribution across the area of the pipe. Positive displacement flow meters can provide better relative accuracy at low flows than orifice-type flow meters. However, a positive displacement meter can be considerably heavier and more costly than non-positive-displacement types such as orifice plates, magnetic or vortex flow meters.

== See also ==
- Water meter
- Gas meter
- Flow measurement
- Displacement volumetric meter
