= Endofa =

Gasoil supplier company

- Industry: Petroleum industry
- Founded: 2013; 12 years ago
- Website: endofa.com

Endofa is a physical gasoil supplier and bunker trader with offices in Houston and Dubai. The company is a physical supplier and cargo trader of gasoil in West Africa, mainly from Walvis Bay and up to the Congo. It is owned by three Danish partners, Kenn Soendergaard, Mads Borggaard, and Allan Frost.

== Company and Technology ==
As a bunker supplier and trader, Endofa reported a turnover of $235 million in January 2014, more than doubling its first-year projections. The company expects to expand its current fleet of seven vessels and projects a 2014 turnover of $350 million.

The company started its first physical bunker supply operation at the end of 2012.

On May 1, 2014, Endofa became the first bunker supplier in West Africa to use a mass flow meter in the transfer of bunkers.

The Bunker Control System used was provided by Insatech, consisting of a flow meter solution based on the Coriolis principle which provides correct mass measurements, temperature and density; thereby working to prevent fraudulent practices such as buy-back, bribes and signing off on false delivery notes.

== Partnerships and expansion ==
On May 14, 2014, Endofa has expanded its operations into Central America through a joint venture with Latin American player Uno. Product will be delivered ex-storage from Puerto Cortés, Honduras, via multi-truck setup with a flow-metered mobile pumping unit to ports on the entire coast. Endofa say they will service the area with Intertek tested and certified ISO:2005 spec RMG380 and RME180 cSt product as well as MGO (DMA).

In the summer of 2015, Endofa opened a new office in Denmark. The company, founded in 2012, also has offices in Houston, France and Angola and is registered in Dubai with its current headquarters - but the company would use its Danish office as headquarters over time, as per Endofa partner Kenn Søndergaard. "Our long-term strategy is that, within the next two to four years, we'll turn the Danish office into our main offices," Kenn said in an interview with ShippingWatch.

Other changes in personnel have come in the Americas, where the company recently opened up in Panama.

In 2018, its Dubai office was acquihired by Bunker Holding, and the other offices were rebranded to PSTV Energy, a play on the company's tagline "Positive Energy".
