= Gasolineras Uno =

Honduran petrol or gas stations company

- Industry: Oil and gas Gas stations
- Headquarters: Tegucigalpa, Honduras
- Area served: Central and South America
- Products: Petroleum
- Parent: Grupo Terra
- Website: www.uno-terra.com

Gasolineras Uno is a Honduran multinational petrol company. It has gas stations across Central America and in Colombia, where it is known as Biomax. Gasolineras Uno's parent is Grupo Terra.

On May 14, 2014, Uno expanded its operations in Central America through a joint venture with Danish firm Endofa. Their gas would be delivered ex-storage from Puerto Cortés, Honduras, via a multi-truck setup with a flow-metered mobile pumping unit to ports on the entire coast.

== Uno Costa Rica Group ==
During 2011, Gasolineras Uno established itself in Costa Rica by buying 14 former Texaco branded stations which belonged to Vitogaz, a multinational gas company with their head offices in France, therefore creating the Uno Costa Rica Group. Their presence in that country was expanded early in 2014, when it bought seven stations that belonged to Grupo Colono in the provinces of Alajuela and Limon.
