= Rotameter =

Device for measuring rate of fluid flow

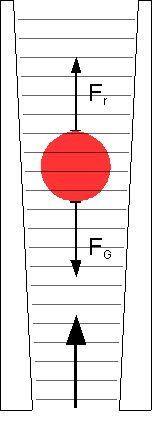

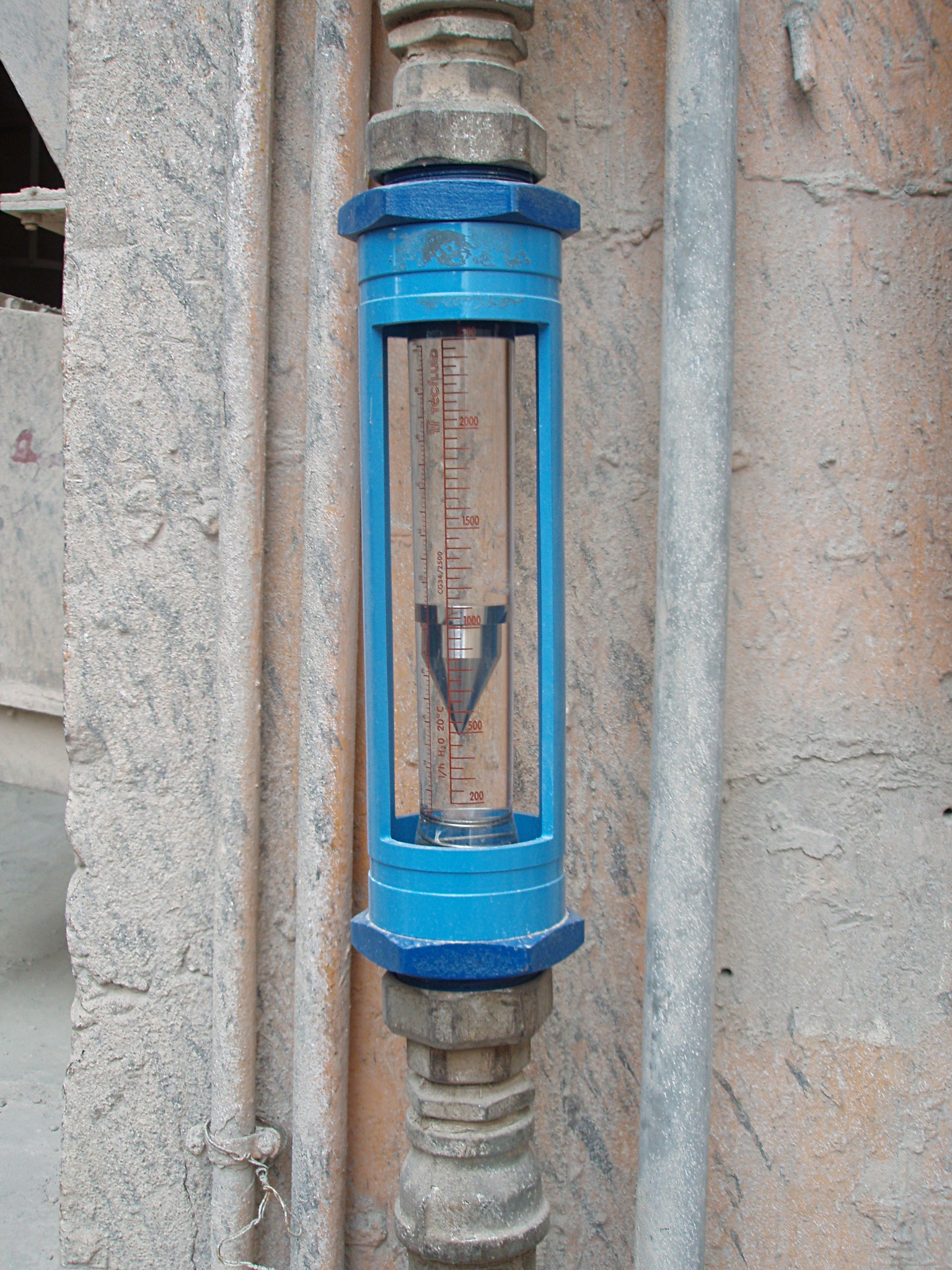
TecFluid-CG34-2500 for water flow measurement

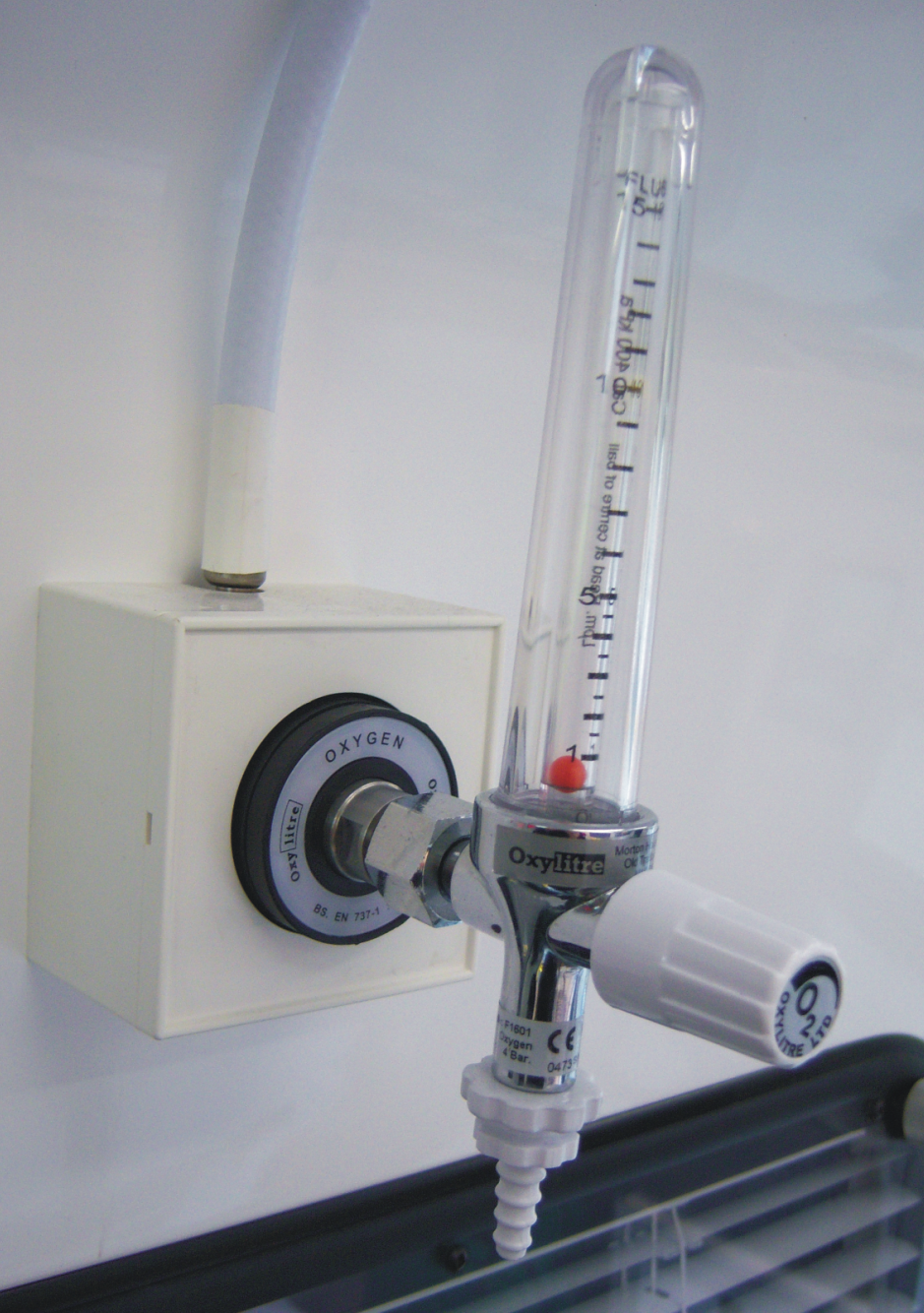
Medical oxygen regulator with rotameter

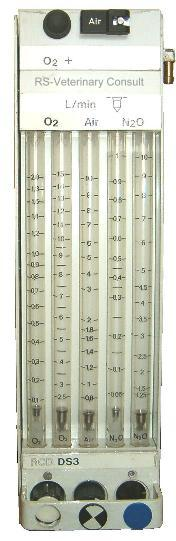
Multi-gas flowmeter

A rotameter is a device that measures the volumetric flow rate of fluid in a closed tube.

It belongs to a class of meters called variable-area flowmeters, which measure flow rate by allowing the cross-sectional area the fluid travels through to vary, causing a measurable effect.

== History ==
The first variable area meter with rotating float was invented by Karl Kueppers (1874–1933) in Aachen in 1908. This is described in the German patent 215225. Felix Meyer founded the company "Deutsche Rotawerke GmbH" in Aachen recognizing the fundamental importance of this invention. They improved this invention with new shapes of the float and of the glass tube. Kueppers invented the special shape for the inside of the glass tube that realized a symmetrical flow scale.

The brand name Rotameter was registered by the British company GEC Elliot automation, Rotameter Co. In many other countries the brand name Rotameter is registered by Rota Yokogawa GmbH & Co. KG in Germany which is now owned by Yokogawa Electric Corp.

== Description ==
A rotameter consists of a tapered tube, typically made of glass with a 'float' (a shaped weight, made either of anodized aluminum or a ceramic) inside, that is pushed up by the drag force of the flow and pulled down by gravity. The drag force for a given fluid and float cross section is a function of flow speed squared only, see drag equation.

A higher volumetric flow rate through a given area increases flow speed and drag force, so the float will be pushed upwards. However, as the inside of the rotameter is cone shaped (widens), the area around the float through which the medium flows increases as the float rises, and thus the flow speed and drag force decrease until there is mechanical equilibrium with the float's weight.

Floats are made in many different shapes, with spheres and ellipsoids being the most common. The float may be diagonally grooved and partially colored so that it rotates axially as the fluid passes. This shows if the float is stuck since it will only rotate if it is free. Readings are usually taken at the top of the widest part of the float; the center for an ellipsoid, or the top for a cylinder. Some manufacturers use a different standard.

The "float" must not float in the fluid: it has to have a higher density than the fluid, otherwise it will float to the top even if there is no flow.

The mechanical nature of the measuring principle provides a flow measurement device that does not require any electrical power. If the tube is made of metal, the float position is transferred to an external indicator via a magnetic coupling. This capability has considerably expanded the range of applications for the variable area flowmeter, since the measurement can observed remotely from the process or used for automatic control.

== Advantages ==
- A rotameter requires no external power or fuel, it uses only the inherent properties of the fluid, along with gravity, to measure flow rate.
- A rotameter is also a relatively simple device that can be mass manufactured out of cheap materials, allowing for its widespread use.
- Since the area of the flow passage increases as the float moves up the tube, the scale is approximately linear.
- Clear glass is used which is highly resistant to thermal shock and chemical action.

== Disadvantages ==
- Due to its reliance on the ability of the fluid or gas to displace the float, graduations on a given rotameter will only be accurate for a given substance at a given temperature. The main property of importance is the density of the fluid; however, viscosity may also be significant. Floats are ideally designed to be insensitive to viscosity; however, this is seldom verifiable from manufacturers' specifications. Either separate rotameters for different densities and viscosities may be used, or multiple scales on the same rotameter can be used.
- Because operation of a rotameter depends on the force of gravity for operation, a rotameter must be oriented vertically. Significant error can result if the orientation deviates from the vertical.
- Due to the direct flow indication the resolution is relatively poor compared to other measurement principles. Readout uncertainty gets worse near the bottom of the scale. Oscillations of the float and parallax may further increase the uncertainty of the measurement.
- Since the float must be read through the flowing medium, some fluids may obscure the reading. A transducer may be required for electronically measuring the position of the float.
- Rotameters are not easily adapted for reading by machine; although magnetic floats that drive a follower outside the tube are available.
- Rotameters are not generally manufactured in sizes greater than 6 inches/150 mm, but bypass designs are sometimes used on very large pipes.

== See also ==
- Thorpe tube flowmeter
