= Vortex flowmeter =

A Vortex flowmeter is a type of flowmeter used for measuring fluid flow rates in an enclosed conduit.

== Composition of vortex flowmeter ==
A vortex flowmeter has the following components: A flow sensor operable to sense pressure variations due to vortex-shedding of a fluid in a passage and to convert the pressure variations to a flow sensor signal, in the form of an electrical signal; and a signal processor operable to receive the flow sensor signal and to generate an output signal corresponding to the pressure variations due to vortex-shedding of the fluid in the passage.

== Working principle ==
When the medium flows through the Bluff body at a certain speed, an alternately arranged vortex belt is generated behind the sides of the Bluff body, called the "von Kármán vortex". Since both sides of the vortex generator alternately generate the vortex, the pressure pulsation is generated on both sides of the generator, which makes the detector produce alternating stress. The piezoelectric element encapsulated in the detection probe body generates an alternating charge signal with the same frequency as the vortex, under the action of alternating stress. The frequency of these pulses is directly proportional to flow rate. The signal is sent to the intelligent flow totalizer to be processed after being amplified by the pre-amplifier.

In certain range of Reynolds number (2×10^4~7×10^6), the relationship among vortex releasing frequency, fluid velocity, and vortex generator facing flow surface width can be expressed by the following equation:

$f=\frac{St\times V}{d}$ where $f$ is the releasing frequency of Carmen vortex, $St$ is the Strouhal number, $V$ is velocity, and $d$ is the width of the triangular cylinder.

== Industrial applications ==
The vortex flowmeter is a broad-spectrum flow meter which can be used for metering, measurement and control of most steam, gas and liquid flow for a unique medium versatility, high stability and high reliability with no moving parts, simple structure and low failure rate. The vortex flowmeter is relatively economical because of its simple flow measurement system and ease of maintenance. It is widely used in heavy industrial applications, power facilities, and energy industries, particularly in steam processes.

== See also ==
- Vortex – Fluid flow revolving around an axis of rotation
- Vortex shedding – Oscillating flow effect resulting from fluid passing over a blunt body
- Flow measurement – Quantification of bulk fluid movement
