= Lease automatic custody transfer unit =

System for measuring liquid hydrocarbons

A Lease Automatic Custody Transfer unit or LACT unit measures the net volume and quality of liquid hydrocarbons. A LACT unit measures volumes in the range of 100 to 7,000 barrels (16 to 1,100 m^{3}) of oil per day.(*LACTs can transfer/measure more than 7000 bbls/day) This system provides for the automatic measurement, sampling, and transfer of oil from the lease location into a pipeline. A system of this type is applicable where larger volumes of oil are being produced and must have a pipeline available in which to connect.
