= Magnetic flow meter =

Device for measuring flow of a fluid

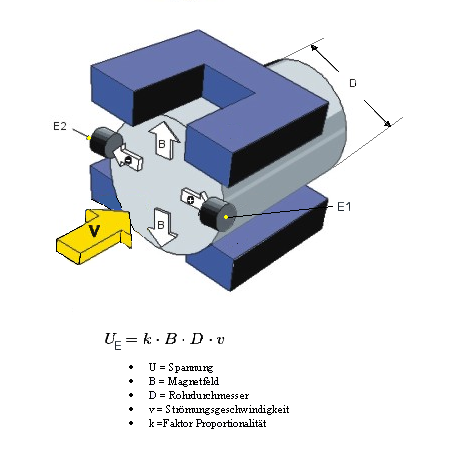
Magnetic flow meter

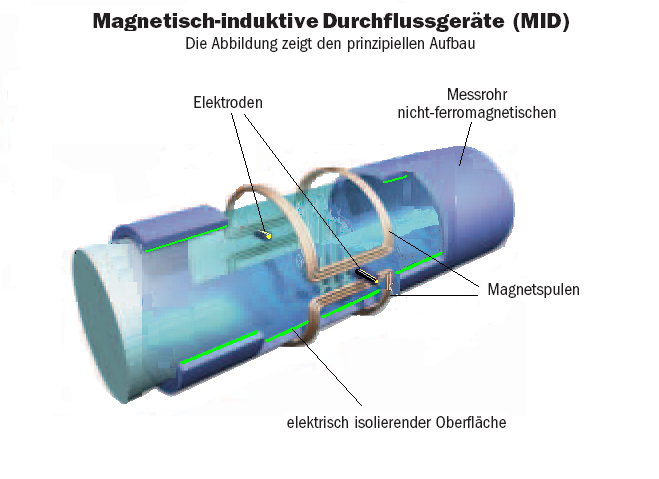
Electromagnetic flow meter

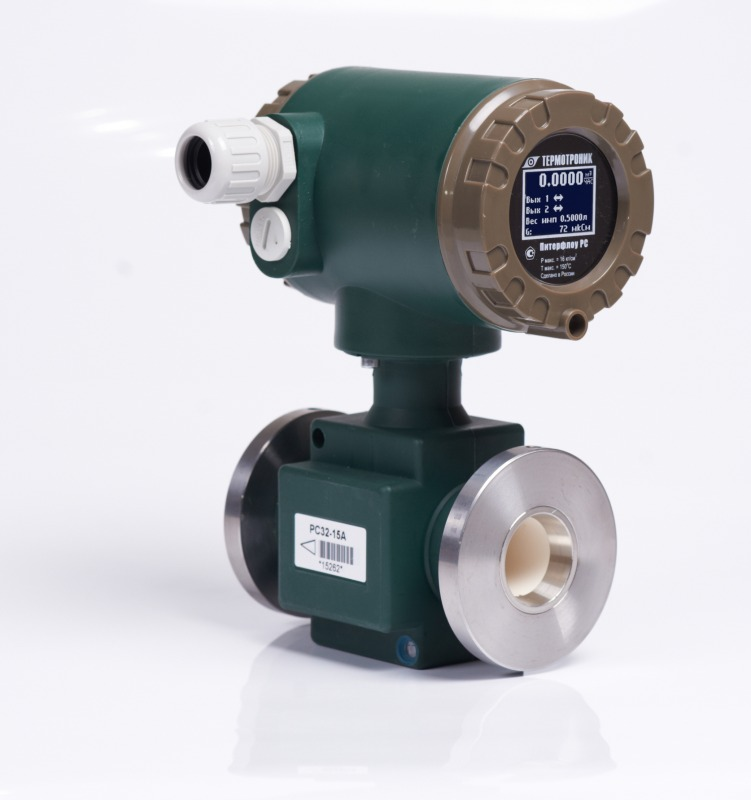
Electromagnetic flow meter

A magnetic flow meter (mag meter, electromagnetic flow meter) is a transducer that measures fluid flow by the voltage induced across the liquid by its flow through a magnetic field. A magnetic field is applied to the metering tube, which results in a potential difference proportional to the flow velocity perpendicular to the flux lines. The physical principle at work is electromagnetic induction. The magnetic flow meter requires a conducting fluid, for example, water that contains ions, and an electrical insulating pipe surface, for example, a rubber-lined steel tube.

If the magnetic field direction were constant, electrochemical and other effects at the electrodes would make the potential difference difficult to distinguish from the fluid flow induced potential difference. To show this in modern magnetic flowmeters, the magnetic field is constantly reversed, cancelling out the electrochemical potential difference, which does not change direction with the magnetic field. This however prevents the use of permanent magnets for magnetic flowmeters.

== See also ==
- Electromagnetic pump
- Flow measurement
- Magnetohydrodynamics
- Water metering
