= Flow meter error =

Error in flow measurement

In flow measurement, flow meter error is typically reported by a percentage indicating non-linearity of the device. This can be expressed as either a +/- percentage based on either the full range capacity of the device or as a percentage of the actual indicated flow. In practice the flow meter error is a combination of repeatability, accuracy and the uncertainty of the reference calibration.

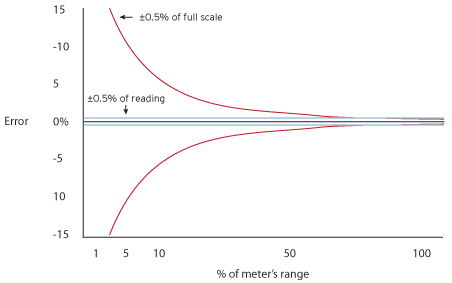
Error chart % of full scale vs % of reading
