= Acoustic Doppler velocimetry =

Measurement equipment

Acoustic Doppler velocimetry (ADV) is designed to record instantaneous velocity components at a single-point with a relatively high frequency. Measurements are performed by measuring the velocity of particles in a remote sampling volume based upon the Doppler shift effect.

== Probe specs and features ==
The probe head includes one transmitter and between two and four receivers. The remote sampling volume is located typically 5 or 10 cm from the tip of the transmitter, but some studies showed that the distance might change slightly. The sampling volume size is determined by the sampling conditions and manual setup. In a standard configuration, the sampling volume is about a cylinder of water with a diameter of 6 mm and a height of 9 mm, although newer laboratory ADVs may have smaller sampling volume (e.g. Sontek microADV, Nortek Vectrino+).

A typical ADV system equipped with N receivers records simultaneously 4.N values with each sample. That is, for each receiver, a velocity component, a signal strength value, a signal-to-noise (SNR) and a correlation value. The signal strength, SNR and correlation values are used primarily to determine the quality and accuracy of the velocity data, although the signal strength (acoustic backscatter intensity) may related to the instantaneous suspended sediment concentration with proper calibration. The velocity component is measured along the line connecting the sampling volume to the receiver. The velocity data must be transformed into a Cartesian system of coordinates and the trigonometric transformation may cause some velocity resolution errors.

Although acoustic Doppler velocimetry (ADV) has become a popular technique in laboratory in field applications, several researchers pointed out accurately that the ADV signal outputs include the combined effects of turbulent velocity fluctuations, Doppler noise, signal aliasing, turbulent shear and other disturbances. Evidences included by high levels of noise and spikes in all velocity components. In turbulent flows, the ADV velocity outputs are a combination of Doppler noise, signal aliasing, velocity fluctuations, installation vibrations and other disturbances. The signal may be further affected adversely by velocity shear across the sampling volume and boundary proximity. Lemmin and Lhermitte, Chanson et al., and Blanckaert and Lemmin discussed the inherent Doppler noise of an ADV system. Spikes may be caused by aliasing of the Doppler signal. McLelland and Nicholas explained the physical processes while Nikora and Goring, Goring and Nikora and Wahl developed techniques to eliminate aliasing errors called "spikes". These methods were developed for steady flow situations and tested in man-made channels. Not all of them are reliable, and the phase-space thresholding despiking technique appears to be a robust method in steady flows). Simply, "raw" ADV velocity data are not "true" turbulent velocities and they should never be used without adequate post-processing (e.g.,). Chanson presented a summary of experiences gained during laboratory and field investigations with both Sontek and Nortek ADV systems.
