= Cyclonic flow meter =

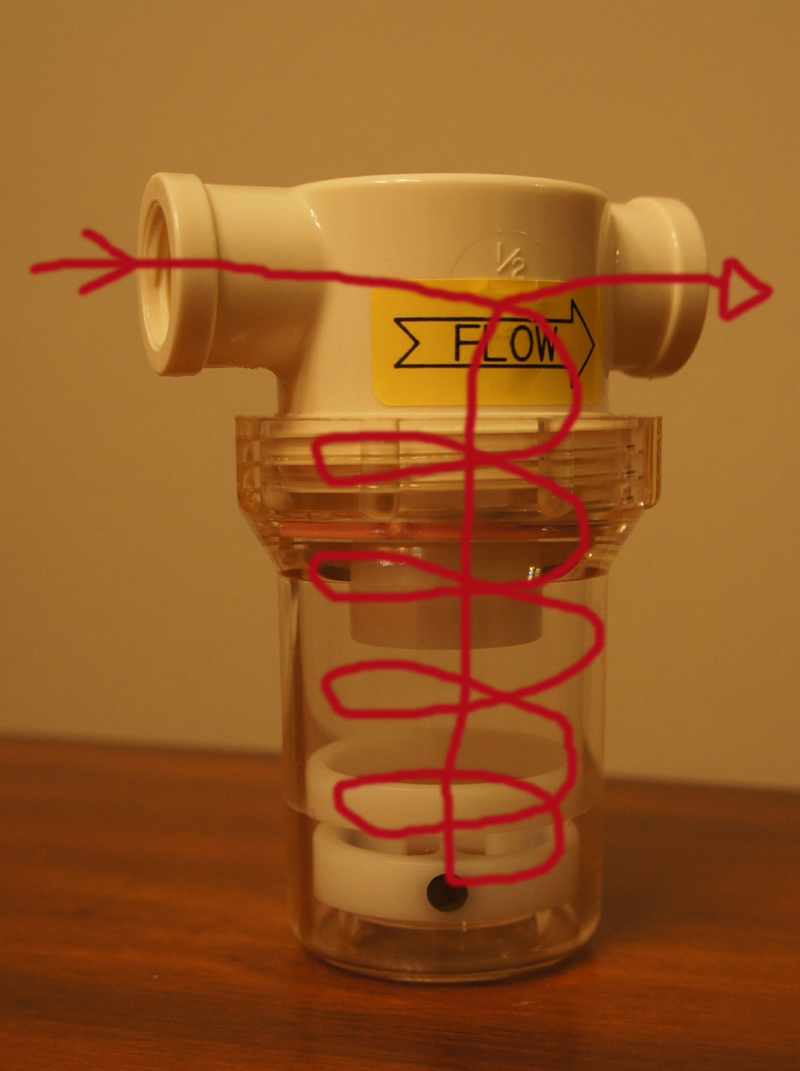
First model of a Cyclonic Flow Meter

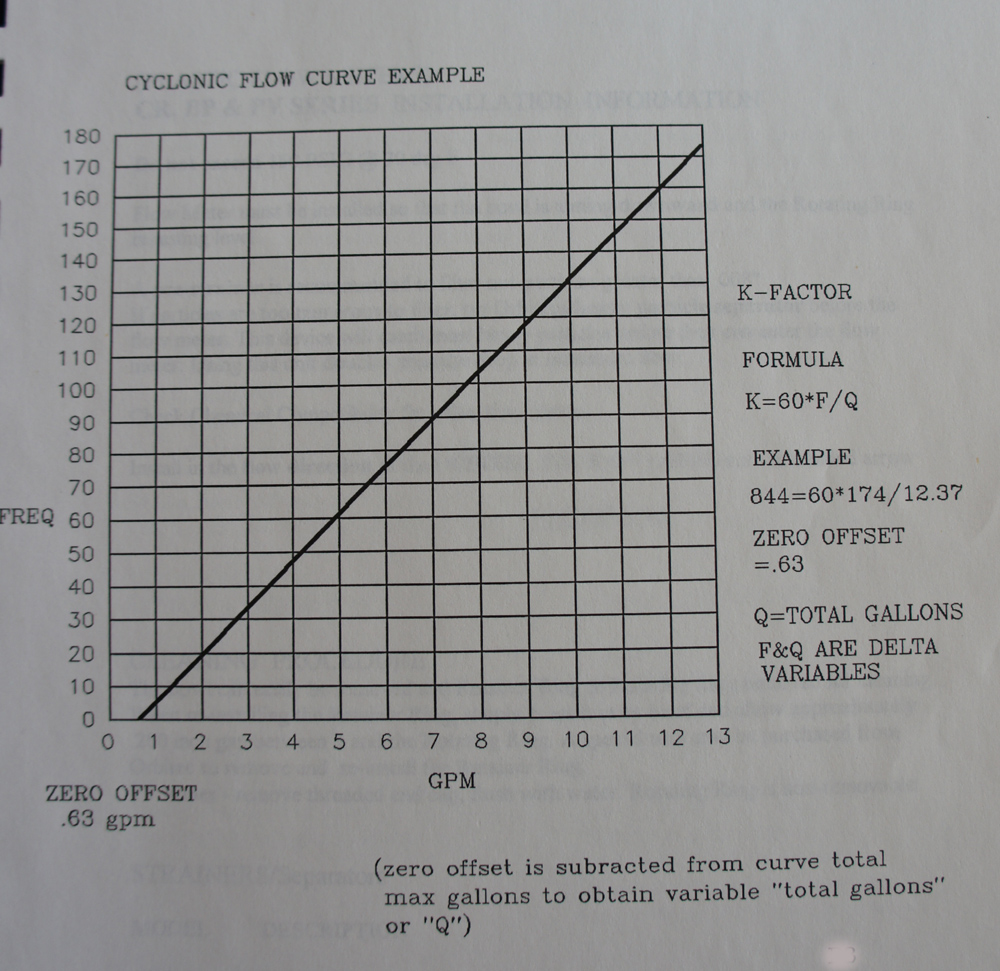
Cyclonic Flow Meter Curve

A Cyclonic Flow Meter is a meter designed to measure the flow rate of a fluid (or gas) within a cylindrical chamber without a differential pressure directly across the rotating member, and without the use of any bearing (such as in a Turbine meter or Paddle wheel). The ring rotates in a "dead end" of the fluid flow, at the tip of the swirling cyclone.

Bypass configuration: A small Cyclonic Flow Meter can be assembled in a "by-pass" configuration across an orifice plate and calibrated as a single unit to obtain high flow rates.

Cyclonic flow meter assembled in "Bypass" configuration and calibrated as a single unit.
