= Giuseppe Avanzini =

Italian mathematician and prelate (1753–1827)

Giuseppe Avanzini (13 December 1753 – 18 June 1827) was an Italian mathematician and prelate.

== Biography ==
He was born in Gaino di Tuscolano Maderno, near Brescia, now Italy, then part of the Republic of Venice, to a poor family, but gained access to education by entering the seminary in Brescia, where he was ordained a priest in 1777. He later was named an abbot. His interest, however, were towards mathematics and physics, and he was a pupil of Domenico Cocoli, and taught mathematics at a private college in Noventa Padovano. In 1797 he became professor of mathematics at the University of Padua, although due to his political leanings, he was forced to resign in 1801. He returned to his post in 1806, and was assigned professor of general physics and applied mathematics. He was the president of the science faculty at the university during 1808–1809. In 1816, he became professor of sublime calculus, succeeding Pietro Cossali in that position. In 1813, he was named an associate of the Accademia Nazionale delle Scienze.

Much of his publications dealt with fluid dynamics and hydraulics. He had fierce polemic arguments in these areas with Vincenzo Brunacci. He died in Padua.

== Works ==
- Carta Topografica e Geologica del Lago di Garda coedited with count Carlo Bettoni
- Nuove ricerche sulla resistenza de' fluidi (1793).
- Osservazioni e sperienze sopra la teoria della resistenza de' fluidi dell'Alembert (1809).
- Nuove ricerche dirette a rettificare la teoria della resistenza de' fluidi e le sue applicazioni (1810).
- Sopra la forza con la quale l'acqua di una gran vasca prismatica sgorgando da una piccola luce spinge innanzi la colonna acquea contenuta in una canna cilindrica, e orizzontale congiunta alla luce medesima memoria (1817).

== Bibliography ==
- De Tipaldo E. : Biografia degli Italiani illustri, IV, Venezia, 1837, pp. 27–31.
- De Villamil R.: The law of Avanzini. The Laws of planes moving at an angle in air and water, New York, 1912.
- Gliozzi M.: Giuseppe Avanzini, in Dizionario Biografico degli Italiani, IV, Roma, Istituto della Enciclopedia Italiana, 1962, p. 644–646.
- Poggendorff J.C.: Biographisch litterarisches Handworterbuch zur Geschichte der exacten Wissenshaften, 1, coll. 77, Leipzig, 1859.
- Giuseppe Avanzini in Enciclopedia Italiana, Istituto della Enciclopedia Italiana, Roma, V, p. 604.
