= Pythagoras in popular culture =

List of appearances of Pythagoras in art and pop culture

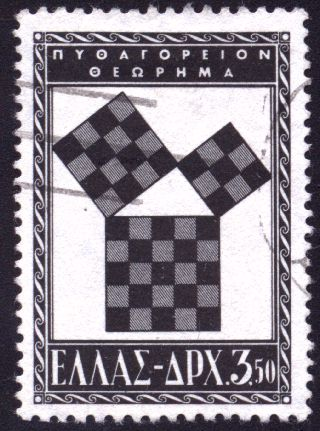
Hellenic Post

The ancient Greek mathematician Pythagoras and his eponymous theorem have made numerous appearances in art and pop culture, typically as a reference to mathematical endeavors, but also as an example of abstruse higher learning in general.

Pythagorean tiling has been used as proofs by the 9th-century Islamic mathematicians Al-Nayrizi and Thābit ibn Qurra, and later by the 19th-century British amateur mathematician Henry Perigal.

At Dulcarnon (literally two-horned) is a reference to the supposed difficulty of the theorem by the 14-century English poet Geoffrey Chaucer in Troilus and Criseyde.

The premise that Pythagoras had left some writings, the manuscripts which have been lost, forms the premise of Pythagoras' Revenge: A Mathematical Mystery by Arturo Sangalli; it was published on 2011-07-25. |-

In the second episode ("Tomorrow and Tomorrow and Tomorrow"), of second season of the science fiction television series Star Trek: Strange New Worlds, set in the 23rd-century, the long-lived Lanthanite Pelia casually remarks that she hasn't taken a math class "...since Pythagoras made the crap up", implying that she was a contemporary.

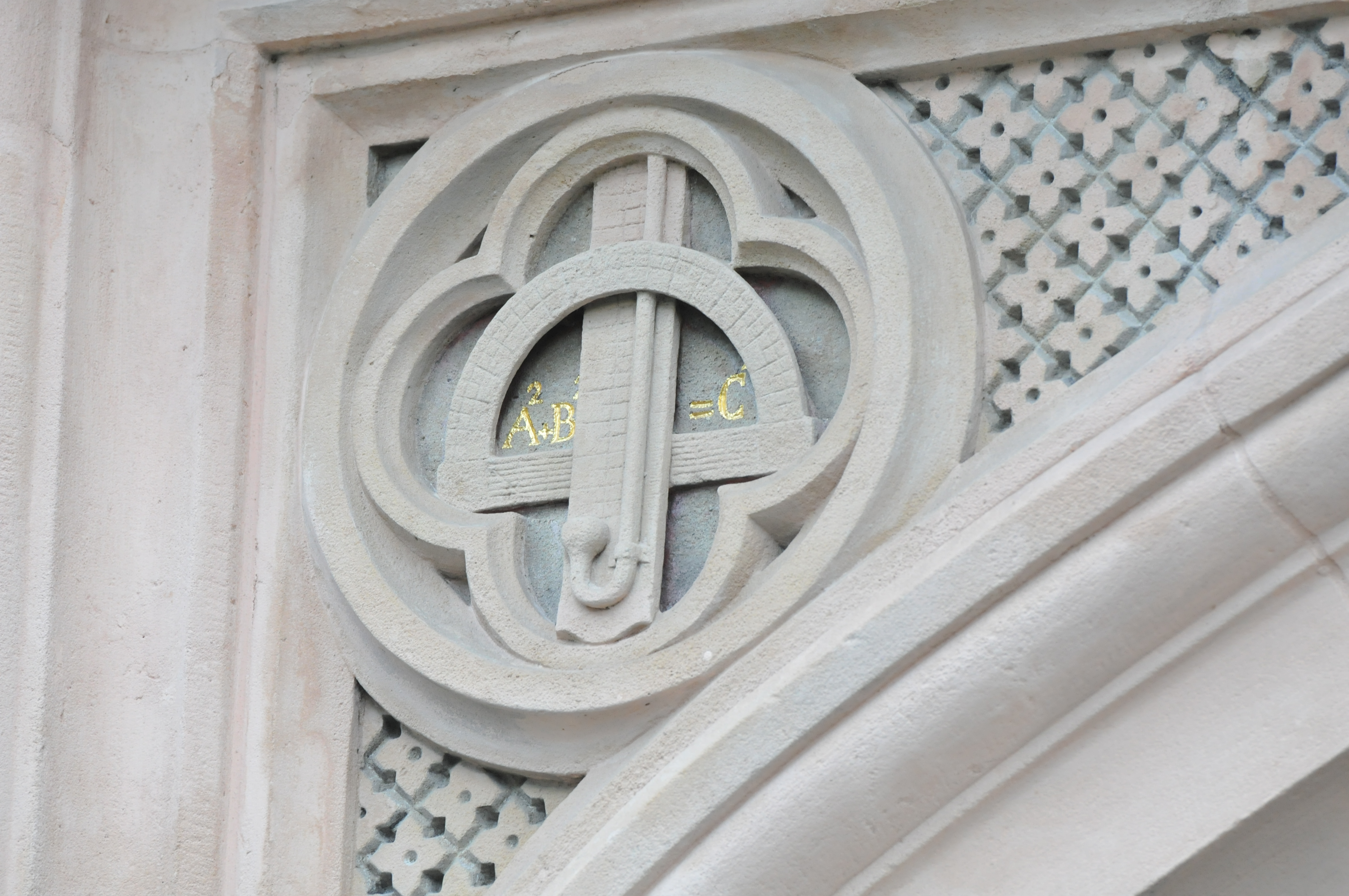
Baugewerkeschule (Construction School) in Zittau, Germany

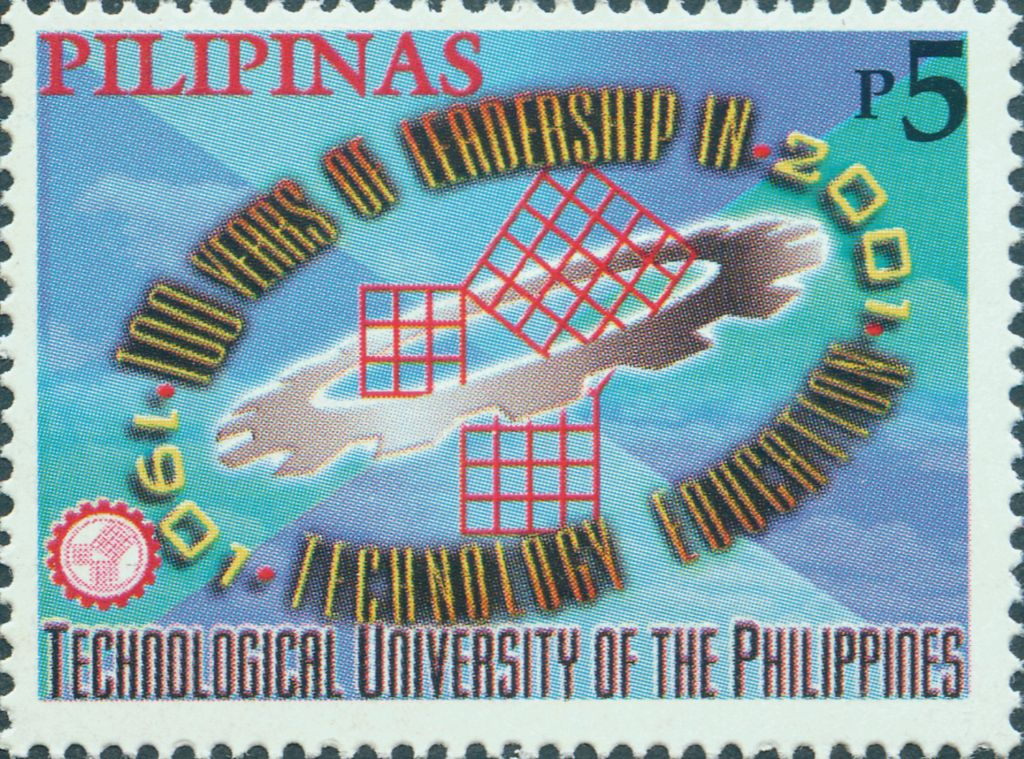
Technological University of the Philippines Centennial, Philippine Postal Corporation

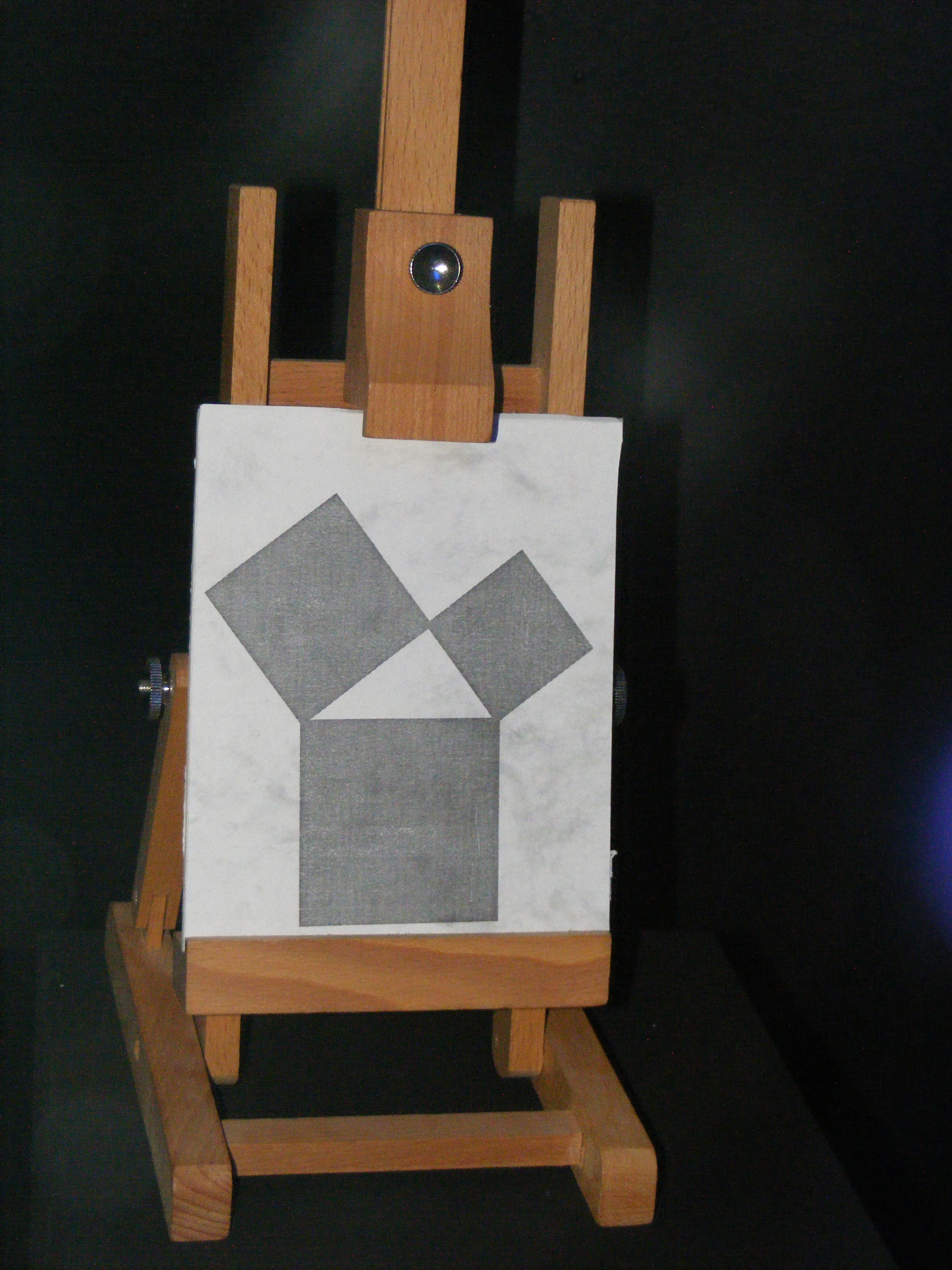
Minimalistic rendering

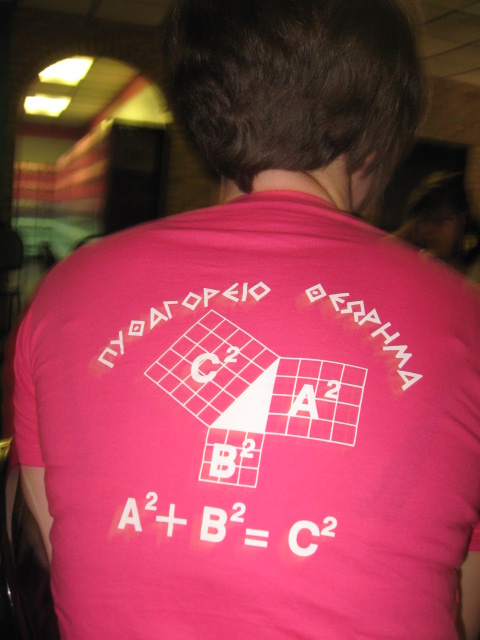
A high school student (presumably) wearing a red Pythagorean theorem t-shirt.
