= Charles de Tinseau d'Amondans =

French military engineer and mathematician

- Born: 19 April 1748; Besançon, France
- Died: 21 March 1822 (aged 73); Montpellier, France
- Education: École du Génie de Mézières (Military School of Artillery)
- Known for: De Gua's theorem
- Scientific career
- Fields: Mathematics; Politics
- Workplaces: French Army

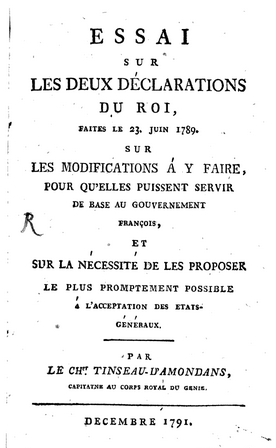
Frontpage of Nouveau plan de Constitution (1793)

Charles-Marie-Thérèse-Léon de Tinseau d'Amondans de Gennes (1748–1822) was a military engineer and mathematician from France in the 18th century.

== Life and work ==
Charles Tinseau was the sixth son (from seven) of Marie-Nicolas Tinseau, seigneur de Gennes, and Jeanne Petramand de Velay, a noble family in the Franche-Comté.

He entered in the École du Génie at Mézières (the Military School of Artillery of France) in 1769 and he graduated in 1771. Gaspard Monge, his professor of mathematics, interested him in mathematics. However, he followed his military career achieving the rank of General Brigadier. In the school he knew the future naturalist Justin Girod-Chantrans, born at Besançon like himself.

In 1772 he presented two papers in the Acadèmie Royal des Sciences (published 1774). The more influential of the two papers was Sur quelques propriétés des solides renfermés par des surfaces composées des lignes droites, in which he demonstrates what is today known as De Gua's theorem. The polemics with Jean Paul de Gua de Malves was granted because de Gua was published an other demonstration thirty years before. Apparently not de Gua, neither Tinseau can have the paternity of a theorem stated by Descartes in 17th century.

From 1789, after the French Revolution, he lived in exile due to his radical monarchic convictions. He was in permanent contact with Charles-Philippe (the future king Charles X of France), being his personal aide-de-camp.

From 1792 he published several politic pamphlets defending the borbonic monarchy against the power of the Etats Generaux. During the Napoleonic period he remained in exile and, probably, acted as an agent of the Allies against France. The intransigence of his political views is evident in the dozen of political writings published between 1792 and 1805.

In 1816, two years after Bourbon Restoration in France in the person of Louis XVIII, he returned to France, but at the advanced age of 68, he retired immediately.

== Bibliography ==
- Aebischer, Anne-Marie; Languereau, Hombeline (2010). Servois ou la géométrie à l'école de l'artillerie (in French). Presses Universitaires de Franche-Comté. ISBN 978-2-8486-7299-1.
- Costabel, Pierre (1983). "L'initiation mathématique de Descartes". Archives de Philosophie (in French). 46 (4): 637–646. ISSN 0003-9632. JSTOR 43034738.
- Osen, James L. (1995). Royalist Political Thought During the French Revolution. Greenwood Press. ISBN 0-313-29441-0.
