= Pons asinorum =

Geometric theorem about isosceles triangles

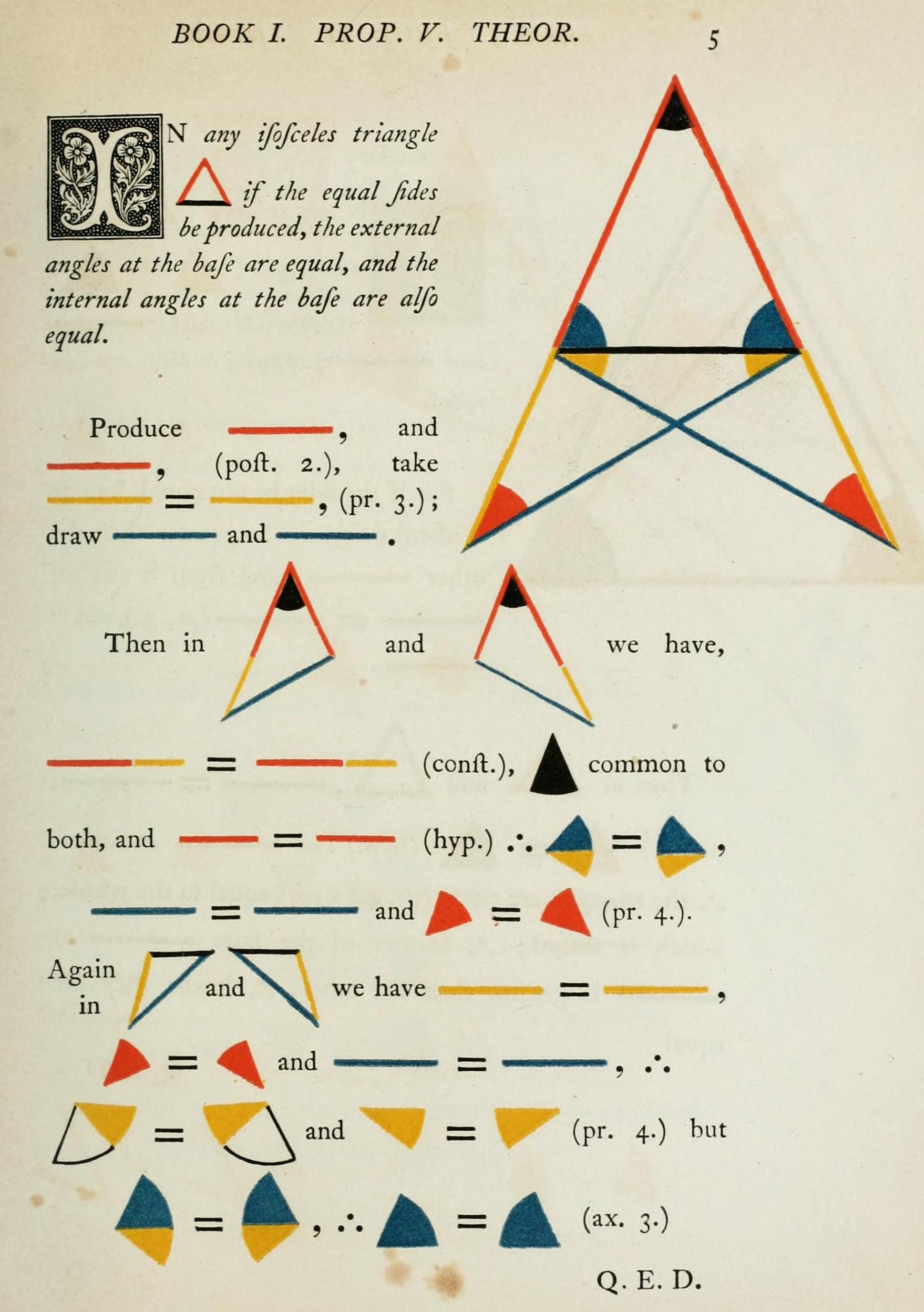
The pons asinorum in Oliver Byrne's edition of The First Six Books of the Elements of Euclid

In geometry, the theorem that the angles opposite the equal sides of an isosceles triangle are themselves equal is known as the pons asinorum (/ˈpɒnz ˌæsɪˈnɔːrəm/ PONZ ass-ih-NOR-əm), Latin for "bridge of asses", or more descriptively as the isosceles triangle theorem. The theorem appears as Proposition 5 of Book 1 in Euclid's Elements. Its converse is also true: if two angles of a triangle are equal, then the sides opposite them are also equal.

Pons asinorum is also used metaphorically for a problem or challenge which acts as a test of critical thinking, referring to the "asses' bridge's" ability to separate capable and incapable reasoners. Its first known usage in this context was in 1645.

== Etymology ==
There are two common explanations for the name pons asinorum, the simplest being that the diagram used resembles a physical bridge. But the more popular explanation is that it is the first real test in the Elements of the intelligence of the reader and functions as a "bridge" to the harder propositions that follow.

Another medieval term for the isosceles triangle theorem was Elefuga which, according to Roger Bacon, comes from Greek elegia "misery", and Latin fuga "flight", that is "flight of the wretches". Though this etymology is dubious, it is echoed in Chaucer's use of the term "flemyng of wreches" for the theorem.

The name Dulcarnon was given to the 47th proposition of Book I of Euclid, better known as the Pythagorean theorem, after the Arabic Dhū'l-Qarnayn ذُو ٱلْقَرْنَيْن, meaning "the owner of the two horns", because diagrams of the theorem showed two smaller squares like horns at the top of the figure. That term has similarly been used as a metaphor for a dilemma. The name pons asinorum has itself occasionally been applied to the Pythagorean theorem.

Carl Friedrich Gauss supposedly once suggested that understanding Euler's identity might play a similar role, as a benchmark indicating whether someone could become a first-class mathematician.

== Proofs ==
=== Euclid and Proclus ===
Proclus' proof

Elements I.5, the pons asinorum

Euclid's statement of the pons asinorum includes a second conclusion that if the equal sides of the triangle are extended below the base, then the angles between the extensions and the base are also equal. Euclid's proof involves drawing auxiliary lines to these extensions. But, as Euclid's commentator Proclus points out, Euclid never uses the second conclusion and his proof can be simplified somewhat by drawing the auxiliary lines to the sides of the triangle instead, the rest of the proof proceeding in more or less the same way.

There has been much speculation and debate as to why Euclid added the second conclusion to the theorem, given that it makes the proof more complicated. One plausible explanation, given by Proclus, is that the second conclusion can be used in possible objections to the proofs of later propositions where Euclid does not cover every case. The proof relies heavily on what is today called side-angle-side (SAS), the previous proposition in the Elements, which says that given two triangles for which two pairs of corresponding sides and their included angles are respectively congruent, then the triangles are congruent.

Proclus' variation of Euclid's proof proceeds as follows: Let $\triangle ABC$ be an isosceles triangle with congruent sides $AB \cong AC$. Pick an arbitrary point $D$ on side $AB$ and then construct point $E$ on $AC$ to make congruent segments $AD \cong AE$. Draw auxiliary line segments $BE$, $DC$, and $DE$. By side-angle-side, the triangles $\triangle BAE \cong \triangle CAD$. Therefore $\angle ABE \cong \angle ACD$, $\angle ADC \cong \angle AEB$, and $BE \cong CD$. By subtracting congruent line segments, $BD \cong CE$. This sets up another pair of congruent triangles, $\triangle DBE \cong \triangle ECD$, again by side-angle-side. Therefore $\angle BDE \cong \angle CED$ and $\angle BED \cong \angle CDE$. By subtracting congruent angles, $\angle BDC \cong \angle CEB$. Finally $\triangle BDC \cong \triangle CEB$ by a third application of side-angle-side. Therefore $\angle CBD \cong \angle BCE$, which was to be proved.

=== Pappus ===
Proclus gives a much shorter proof attributed to Pappus of Alexandria. This is not only simpler but it requires no additional construction at all. The method of proof is to apply side-angle-side to the triangle and its mirror image. More modern authors, in imitation of the method of proof given for the previous proposition have described this as picking up the triangle, turning it over and laying it down upon itself. This method is lampooned by Charles Dodgson in Euclid and his Modern Rivals, calling it an "Irish bull" because it apparently requires the triangle to be in two places at once.

The proof is as follows: Let ABC be an isosceles triangle with AB and AC being the equal sides. Consider the triangles ABC and ACB, where ACB is considered a second triangle with vertices A, C and B corresponding respectively to A, B and C in the original triangle. $\angle A$ is equal to itself, AB = AC and AC = AB, so by side-angle-side, triangles ABC and ACB are congruent. In particular, $\angle B = \angle C$.

=== Others ===
A textbook proof

A standard textbook method is to construct the bisector of the angle at A. This is simpler than Euclid's proof, but Euclid does not present the construction of an angle bisector until proposition 9. So the order of presentation of Euclid's propositions would have to be changed to avoid the possibility of circular reasoning.

The proof proceeds as follows: As before, let the triangle be ABC with AB = AC. Construct the angle bisector of $\angle BAC$ and extend it to meet BC at X. AB = AC and AX is equal to itself. Furthermore, $\angle BAX = \angle CAX$, so, applying side-angle-side, triangle BAX and triangle CAX are congruent. It follows that the angles at B and C are equal.

Legendre uses a similar construction in Éléments de géométrie, but taking X to be the midpoint of BC. The proof is similar but side-side-side must be used instead of side-angle-side, and side-side-side is not given by Euclid until later in the Elements.

== In inner product spaces ==
The isosceles triangle theorem holds in inner product spaces over the real or complex numbers. In such spaces, given vectors x, y, and z, the theorem says that if $x + y + z = 0$ and $\|x\| = \|y\|,$ then $\|x - z\| = \|y - z\|.$

Since $\|x - z\|^2 = \|x\|^2 - 2x\cdot z + \|z\|^2$ and $x \cdot z = \|x\|\|z\|\cos\theta,$ where θ is the angle between the two vectors, the conclusion of this inner product space form of the theorem is equivalent to the statement about equality of angles.

== Metaphorical usage ==
Uses of the pons asinorum as a metaphor for a test of critical thinking include:

- Richard Aungerville's 14th century The Philobiblon contains the passage "Quot Euclidis discipulos retrojecit Elefuga quasi scopulos eminens et abruptus, qui nullo scalarum suffragio scandi posset! Durus, inquiunt, est his sermo; quis potest eum audire?", which compares the theorem to a steep cliff that no ladder may help scale and asks how many would-be geometers have been turned away.
- The term pons asinorum, in both its meanings as a bridge and as a test, is used as a metaphor for finding the middle term of a syllogism.
- The 18th-century poet Thomas Campbell wrote a humorous poem called "Pons asinorum" where a geometry class assails the theorem as a company of soldiers might charge a fortress; the battle was not without casualties.
- Economist John Stuart Mill called Ricardo's law of rent the pons asinorum of economics.
- The Finnish aasinsilta and Swedish åsnebrygga is a literary technique where a tenuous, even contrived connection between two arguments or topics, which is almost but not quite a non sequitur, is used as an awkward transition between them. In serious text, it is considered a stylistic error, since it belongs properly to the stream of consciousness- or causerie-style writing. Typical examples are ending a section by telling what the next section is about, without bothering to explain why the topics are related, expanding a casual mention into a detailed treatment, or finding a contrived connection between the topics (e.g. "We bought some red wine; speaking of red liquids, tomorrow is the World Blood Donor Day").
- In Dutch, ezelsbruggetje ('little bridge of asses') is the word for a mnemonic. The same is true for the German Eselsbrücke.
- In Czech, oslí můstek has two meanings – it can describe either a contrived connection between two topics or a mnemonic.

== Artificial intelligence proof myth ==
A persistent piece of mathematical folklore claims that an artificial intelligence program discovered an original and more elegant proof of this theorem. In fact, Marvin Minsky recounts that he had rediscovered the Pappus proof (which he was not aware of) by simulating what a mechanical theorem prover might do.
