= Pietro Cossali =

Italian mathematician

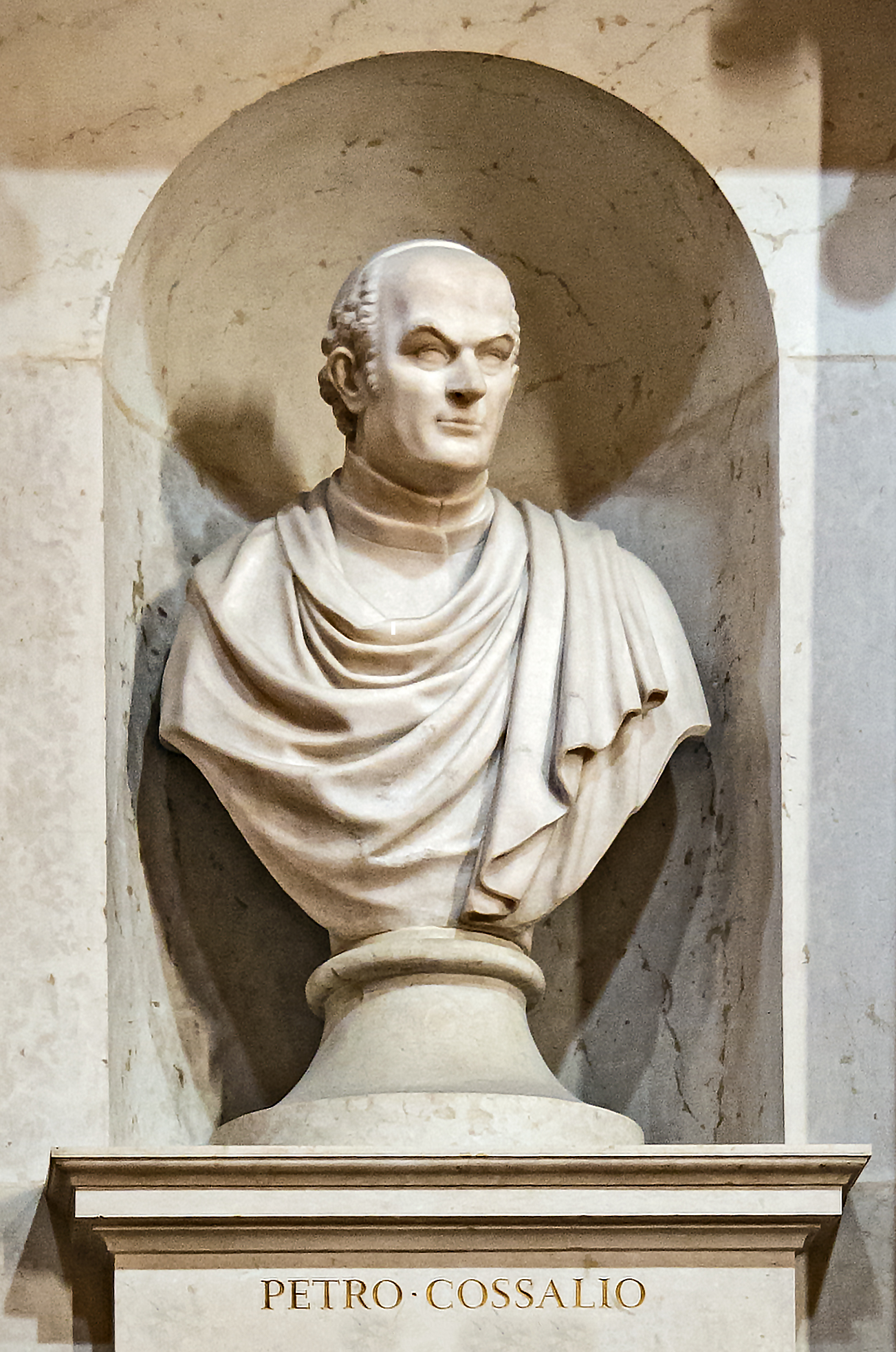
- Bust of Pietro Cossali Sant'Anastasia in Verona.
- Born: June 29, 1748; Verona
- Died: December 20, 1815 (aged 67); Padua
- Scientific career
- Fields: history of mathematics, astronomy
- Institutions: University of Parma, University of Padua

Pietro Cossali CR (29 June 1748 — 20 December 1815) was an Italian mathematician, physicist and astronomer.

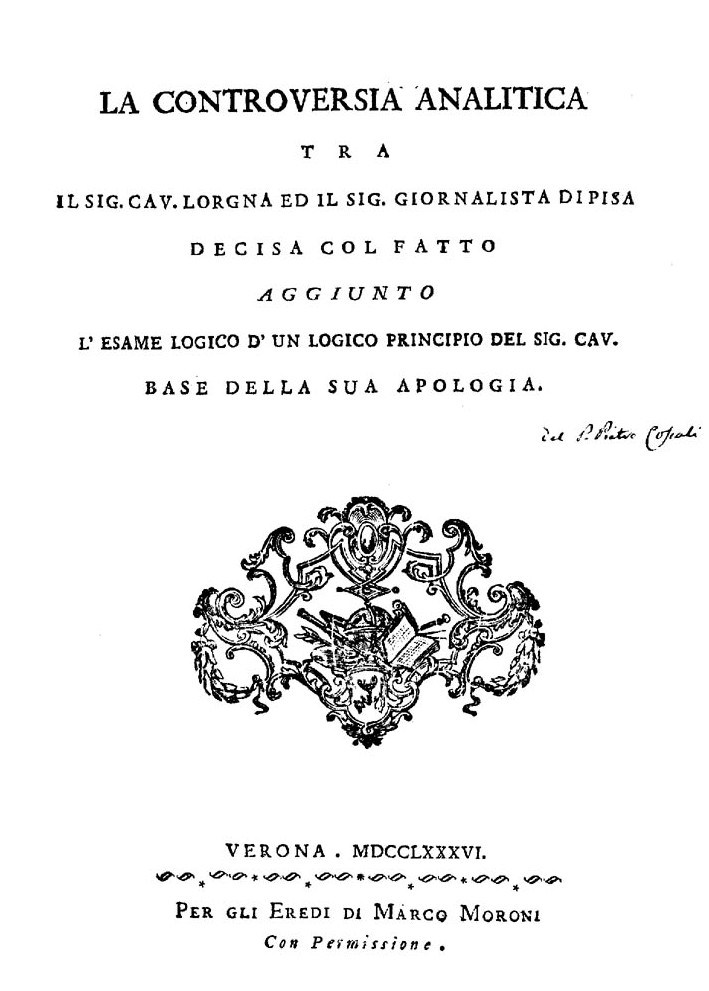
Controversia analitica, 1786

From 1787 to 1805, he taught physics at the University of Parma. In 1805, Napoleon named Cossali a professor of higher calculus at the University of Padua.

From 1797 to 1799, he wrote Origin, Transmission to Italy, and Early Progress of Algebra There (Italian: Origine, transporto in Italia, primi progressi in essa dell'algebra), in which he describes mathematical achievements from the emergence of algebra due to Fibonacci to the new research on casus irreducibilis in the 18th century. This work can be considered the first professional text on the history of Italian mathematics. In this work, Cossali corrects some factual mistakes made earlier by Jean Paul de Gua de Malves, John Wallis and Jean-Étienne Montucla, although he makes another important error in attributing everything after Fibonacci and before Luca Pacioli to the latter.

Besides his works on mathematics and its history, Cossali also wrote on astronomy. His articles were published in Ephémérides astronomiques.
