= Garfield's proof of the Pythagorean theorem =

Mathematical proof by James Garfield

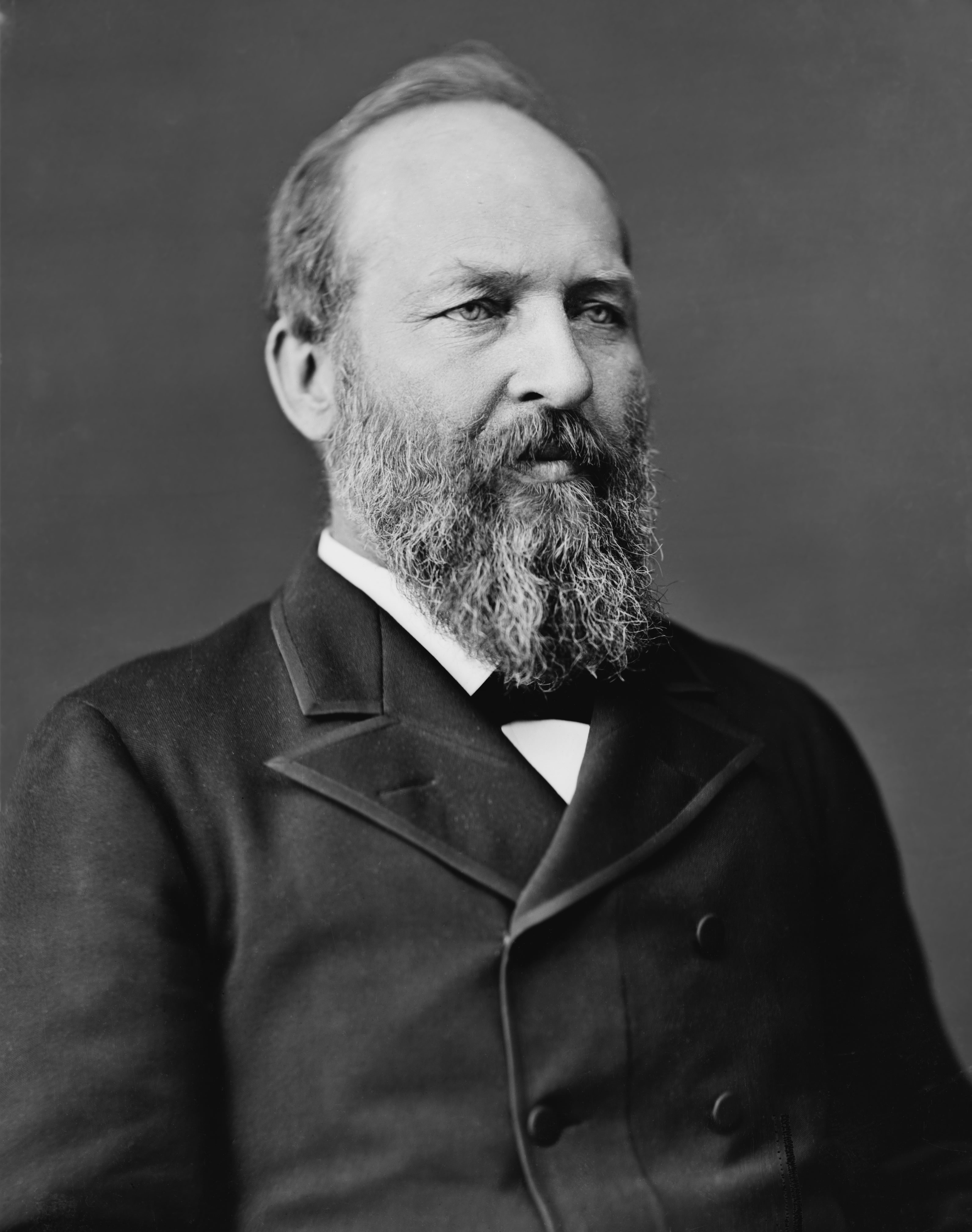
Garfield in 1881

American politician James. A Garfield constructed an original proof of the Pythagorean theorem. Garfield's proof of the Pythagorean theorem was published in 1876 in the New-England Journal of Education (now just the Journal of Education). When the proof was published, Garfield was a congressman from Ohio. He became the 20th President of the United States in 1881, and served in that position until his death later that year after being assassinated. Garfield is thus far the only American president to have made an original contribution to mathematics. William Dunham, a mathematician and historian of mathematics, praised Garfield's proof as "a very clever" argument. This proof appears as the 231st in The Pythagorean Proposition, a compendium of 370 different proofs of the Pythagorean theorem.

== The proof ==
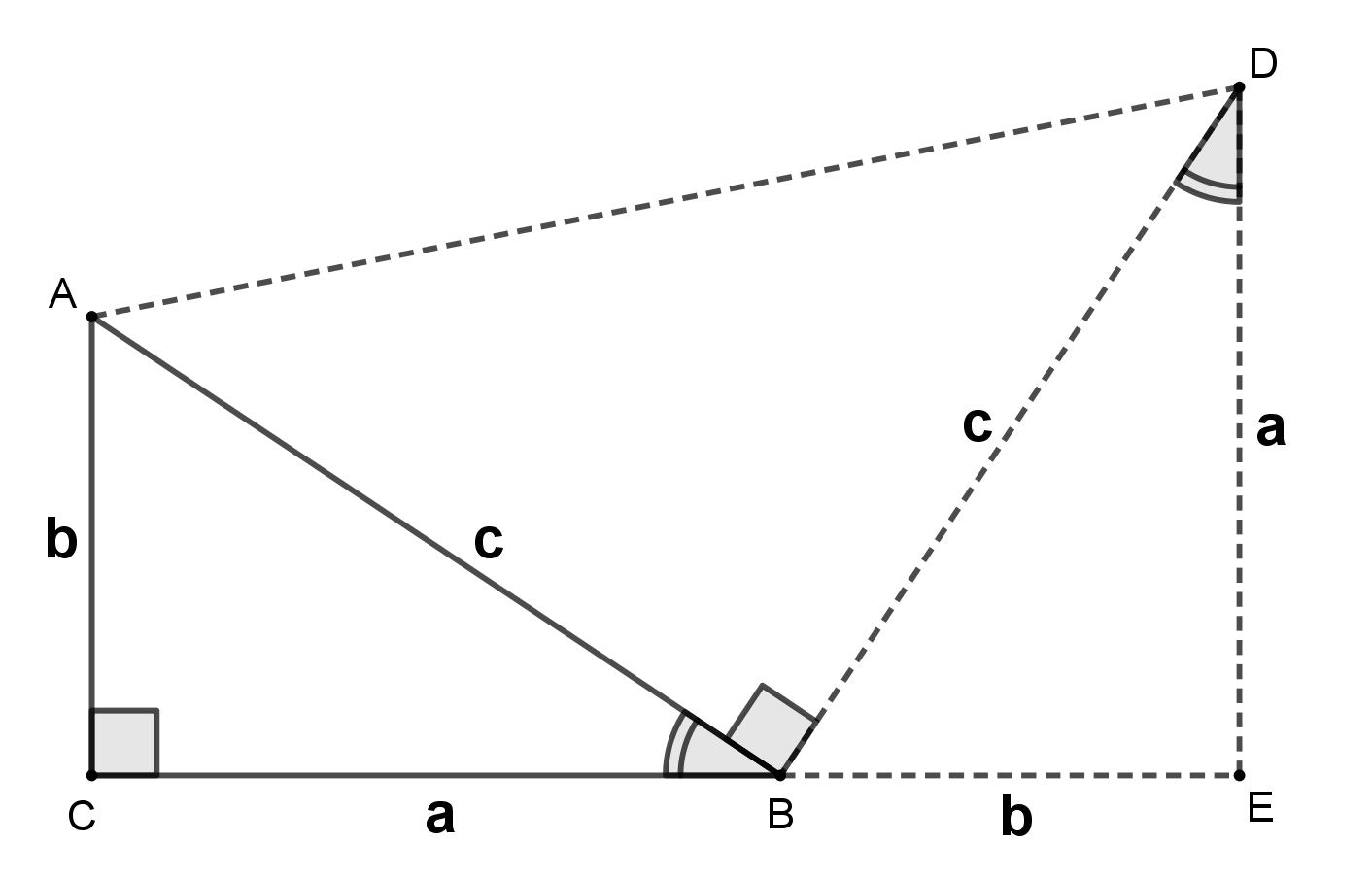
Diagram to explain Garfield's proof of the Pythagorean theorem

In the figure, $ABC$ is a right-angled triangle with right angle at $C$. The side-lengths of the triangle are $a,b,c$. Pythagorean theorem asserts that $c^2=a^2+b^2$.

To prove the theorem, Garfield drew a line through $B$ perpendicular to $AB$ and on this line chose a point $D$ such that $BD=BA$. Then, from $D$ he dropped a perpendicular $DE$ upon the extended line $CB$. From the figure, one can easily see that the triangles $ABC$ and $BDE$ are congruent. Since $AC$ and $DE$ are both perpendicular to $CE$, they are parallel and so the quadrilateral $ACED$ is a trapezoid. The theorem is proved by computing the area of this trapezoid in two different ways.

First,

$$\begin{align}\text{area of trapezoid } ACED & = \text{height}\times \text{average of parallel sides}\\[6pt]
&= CE\times\frac{1}{2}(AC+DE)=(a+b)\times \frac{1}{2}(a+b).
\end{align}$$

Second,

$$\begin{align}
\text{area of trapezoid } ACED & = \text{area of }\triangle ACB + \text{area of } \triangle ABD + \text{area of } \triangle BDE \\[6pt]
& = \frac{1}{2}(a\times b) + \frac{1}{2}(c\times c) + \frac{1}{2}(a\times b).
\end{align}$$

From these one gets

$$(a+b)\times \frac{1}{2}(a+b) = \frac{1}{2}(a\times b) + \frac{1}{2}(c\times c) + \frac{1}{2}(a\times b),$$

which simplifies to

$$a^2+b^2=c^2.$$

== Relationship to other proofs ==
One common proof of the Pythagorean theorem

Garfield's proof is a variant of one of the algebraic proofs (pictured at right), but using only half of the diagram. The pictured version observes that the area of the outer square equals the area of the inner square plus four congruent triangles, that is,

$$(a+b)\times (a+b) = (c\times c) + 4\times\frac{1}{2}(a\times b),$$

which simplifies the same way.
