= De Gua's theorem =

Three-dimensional analog of the Pythagorean theorem

Tetrahedron with a right-angle corner in O

In mathematics, de Gua's theorem is a three-dimensional analog of the Pythagorean theorem named after Jean Paul de Gua de Malves. It states that if a tetrahedron has a right-angle corner (like the corner of a cube), then the square of the area of the face opposite the right-angle corner is the sum of the squares of the areas of the other three faces:
$$A_{ABC}^2 = A_{\color {blue} ABO}^2+A_{\color {green} ACO}^2+A_{\color {red} BCO}^2$$
De Gua's theorem can be applied for proving a special case of Heron's formula.

== Generalizations ==
The Pythagorean theorem and de Gua's theorem are special cases (n = 2 and n=3) respectively of a general theorem about n-simplices with a right-angle corner, proved by P. S. Donchian and H. S. M. Coxeter in 1935. This, in turn, is a special case of a yet more general theorem by Donald R. Conant and William A. Beyer (1974), which can be stated as follows.

Let U be a measurable subset of a k-dimensional affine subspace of $\mathbb{R}^n$ (so $k \le n$). For any subset $I \subseteq \{ 1, \ldots, n \}$ with exactly k elements, let $U_I$ be the orthogonal projection of U onto the linear span of $e_{i_1}, \ldots, e_{i_k}$, where $I = \{i_1, \ldots, i_k\}$ and $e_1, \ldots, e_n$ is the standard basis for $\mathbb{R}^n$. Then
$$\operatorname{vol}_k^2(U) = \sum_I \operatorname{vol}_k^2(U_I),$$
where $\operatorname{vol}_k(U)$ is the k-dimensional volume of U and the sum is over all subsets $I \subseteq \{ 1, \ldots, n \}$ with exactly k elements.

De Gua's theorem and its generalisation (above) to n-simplices with right-angle corners correspond to the special case where k = n−1 and U is an (n−1)-simplex in $\mathbb{R}^n$ with vertices on the co-ordinate axes. For example, suppose n = 3, k = 2 and U is the triangle $\triangle ABC$ in $\mathbb{R}^3$ with vertices A, B and C lying on the $x_1$-, $x_2$- and $x_3$-axes, respectively. The subsets $I$ of $\{ 1, 2, 3 \}$ with exactly 2 elements are $\{ 2,3 \}$, $\{ 1,3 \}$ and $\{ 1,2 \}$. By definition, $U_{\{ 2,3 \}}$ is the orthogonal projection of $U = \triangle ABC$ onto the $x_2 x_3$-plane, so $U_{\{ 2,3 \}}$ is the triangle $\triangle OBC$ with vertices O, B and C, where O is the origin of $\mathbb{R}^3$. Similarly, $U_{\{ 1,3 \}} = \triangle AOC$ and $U_{\{ 1,2 \}} = \triangle ABO$, so the Conant–Beyer theorem says

$$\operatorname{vol}_2^2(\triangle ABC) = \operatorname{vol}_2^2(\triangle OBC) + \operatorname{vol}_2^2(\triangle AOC) + \operatorname{vol}_2^2(\triangle ABO),$$
which is de Gua's theorem.

The generalisation of de Gua's theorem to n-simplices with right-angle corners can also be obtained as a special case from the Cayley–Menger determinant formula.

De Gua's theorem can also be generalized to arbitrary tetrahedra and to pyramids, similarly to how the law of cosines generalises Pythagoras' theorem.

== History ==
Jean Paul de Gua de Malves (1713–1785) published the theorem in 1783, but around the same time a slightly more general version was published by another French mathematician, Charles de Tinseau d'Amondans (1746–1818), as well. However the theorem had also been known much earlier to Johann Faulhaber (1580–1635) and René Descartes (1596–1650).

== See also ==
- Vector area and projected area
- Bivector
