= Domenico Cocoli =

Italian mathematician and physicist (1747–1812)

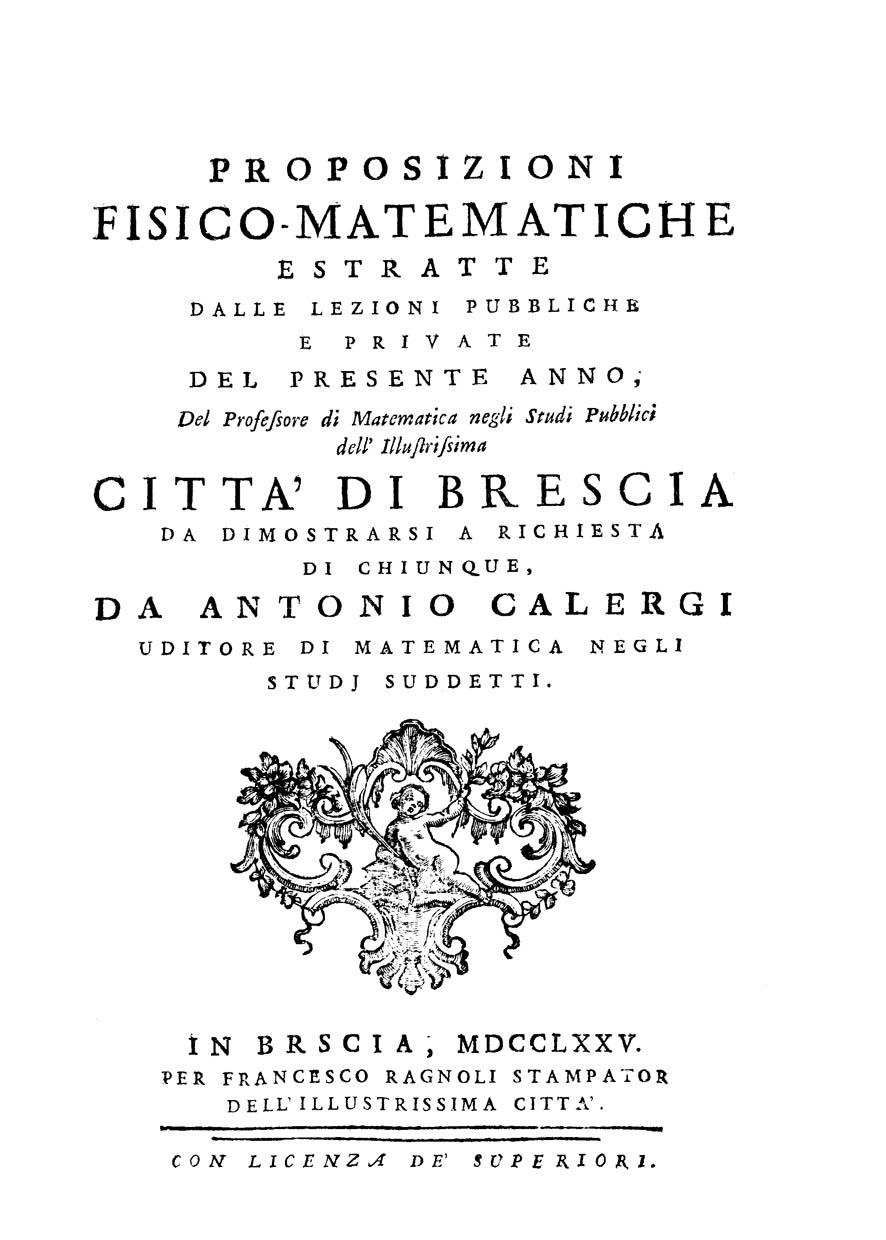
Proposizioni fisico-matematiche, 1775

Domenico Cocoli (Brescia, 12 August 1747 – 27 November 1812) was an Italian mathematician and physicist, especially active on hydraulics. He was a top physicist of the late Republic of Venice, then of the Napoleonic Italian Republic.

== Biography ==
Born in Brescia in 1747, he began studying architecture and later was awarded a pension by a wealthy patron to continue his studies. In 1774 he had the chair of physics and mathematics. In 1777 he published his Elements of Geometry and Trigonometry. Thanks to the fame of the book, he became a consultant of the Republic of Venice being among the five physicists who took care of the problem of the floodings of the Brenta river. Until 1797 he carried out various assignments. In 1802 he was appointed member of the Collegio dei Dotti of the Napoleonic Italian Republic.In 1806 he became a general inspector inside the "Corpo di Acque e Strade", always inside the Napoleonic Italian Republic.

== Works ==
- Proposizioni fisico-matematiche (in Italian). Brescia: Francesco Ragnoli. 1775.
- Dissertazione sopra il quesito Stabilire la vera teoria delle acque uscenti da' fori aperti ne' vasi, e mostrare in quai circostanze possa ella applicarsi alle acque correnti negli alvei naturali (in Italian). Brescia: Pasini. 1783.
- Elementi di geometria e trigonometria ad uso delle scuole pubbliche dell'illustrissima città di Brescia (in Italian). Brescia: Pasini. 1792.

== See also ==
- Drainage basin
- Trigonometry
- Communicating vessels
