= At Dulcarnon =

English phrase – at the end of one's wits

Dulcarnon or dulcarnoun is a term used in the Middle English poem Troilus and Criseyde by Geoffrey Chaucer, in a line given to Criseyde: "at dulcarnoun, right at my wittes ende". It became proverbial. The etymology is from an Arabic phrase dhū-al-qarnayn meaning "two-horned", and the term was in use in medieval Latin.

Dulcarnon was used to refer to the exposition of the Pythagorean theorem in the Elements of Euclid, considered baffling. In Chaucer's poem, Pandarus conflates it with the pons asinorum, an earlier result in Euclid on the isosceles triangle. Alexander Neckam had used it for the Pythagorean theorem, though in a way that allowed for the confusion; Richard of Wallingford applied it to the Pythagorean theorem.

By the 17th century, to be "at Dulcarnon" was to be at the end of one's wits, or in a dilemma in the sense of a predicament. John Selden made the connection to dū'lkarnayn, a Persian term via Arabic, writing in his 1612 preface to Michael Drayton's Polyolbion. He used it to point to Chaucer as a learned and a witty poet. Stephen Skinner in the later 17th century corrected a muddled annotation to Chaucer's line by Thomas Speght. Walter William Skeat adopted the derivation of Dulcarnon from the Arabic: for which see Dhul-Qarnayn.

In consequence, it is to the word's derived Eastern associations that Henry Milner Rideout points in the title of his 1926 Dulcarnon: A Novel, described as "one of his best adventures in the fairyland of the Orient".
