= Jean Paul de Gua de Malves =

French mathematician (1713–1785)

Jean Paul de Gua de Malves (1713 – June 2, 1785), known as Gua, was a French mathematician.

Born at Malves-en-Minervois (Aude), Gua was the son of Jean de Gua, baron de Malves, and his wife Jeanne de Harrugue. His father was ruined by the speculations of John Law's Company and had to sell his estates. Gua became a priest and mathematician.

In 1740, he published a work on analytical geometry in which he applied geometry, without the aid of differential calculus, to find the tangents, asymptotes, and various singular points of an algebraic curve.

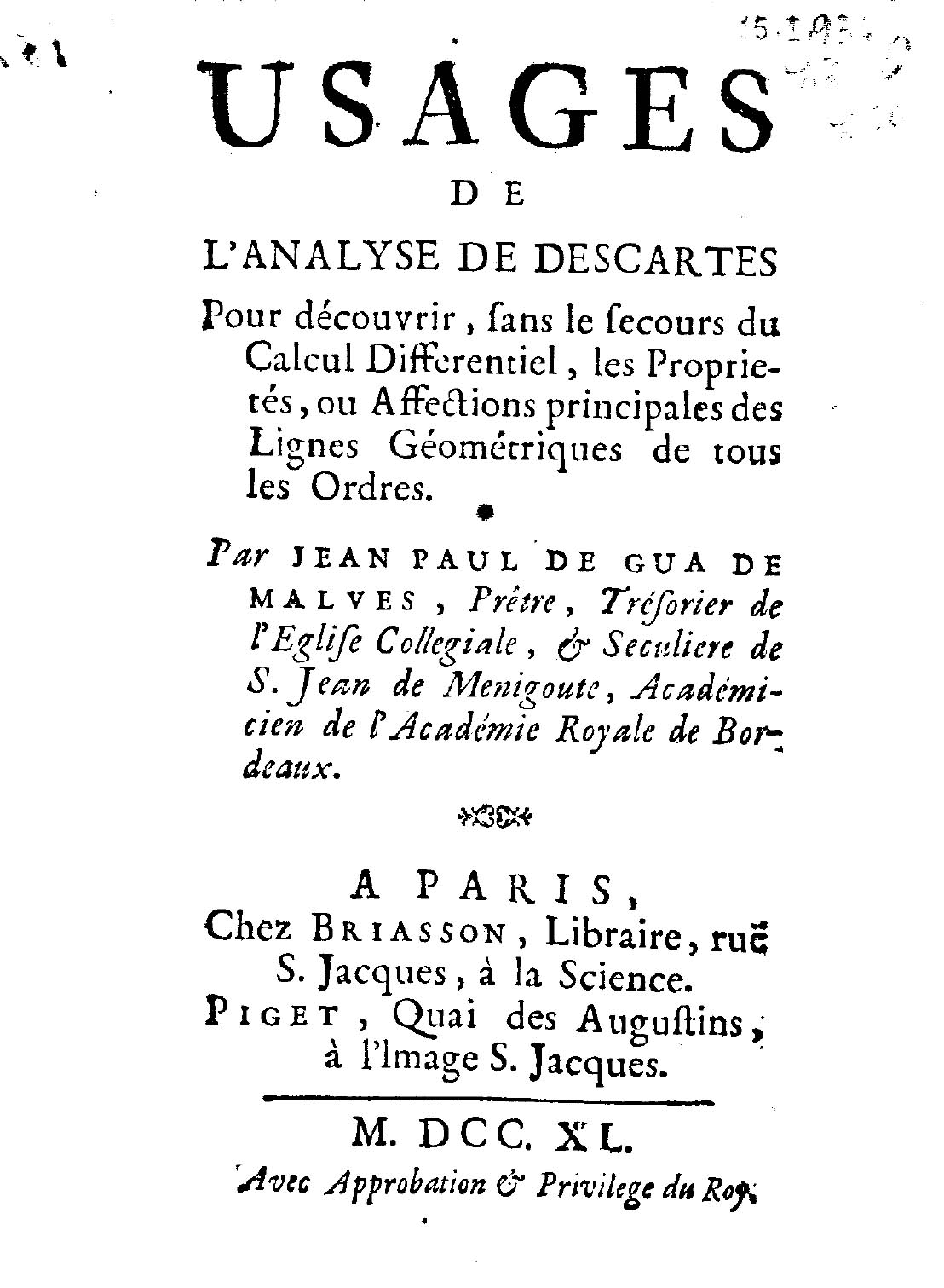
Usages de l'analyse de Descartes, 1740

Gua further showed how singular points and isolated loops were affected by conical projection. He gave the proof of Descartes's rule of signs which is to be found in most modern works. It is not clear whether Descartes ever proved it strictly, and Newton seems to have regarded it as obvious.

Gua was acquainted with many of the French philosophes during the last decades of the Ancien Régime. He was an early, short-lived, participant, then editor (later replaced by Diderot) of the project that ended up as the Encyclopédie. Condorcet claimed that it was in fact Gua who recruited Diderot to the project, though this claim has never been verified. In either case, Jean-Paul and Jean le Rond d'Alembert, also thought to have been recruited by the de Gua, first show up on the December 1746 payroll of the publishers who were backing the Encyclopédie project. Diderot was added just weeks later and took over as editor on 16 October 1747.

He was elected a Fellow of the Royal Society in 1743.

At the funeral in Paris of the "profound geometrician", as Diderot called Gua, the eulogy was given by Condorcet.

== See also ==
- De Gua's theorem

== Bibliography ==
- Arthur M. Wilson: Diderot. Oxford University Press, New York, 1972, pp. 79–81.
- Nicolas de Condorcet, « Éloge de M. l’abbé de Gua », Œuvres de Condorcet, Firmin Didot frères, 1847-1849, Paris, p. 241-58. (online copy)
- Rene Taton: Gua De Malves, Jean Paul De. Complete Dictionary of Scientific Biography, 2008.

An original entry was based on the book A Short Account of the History of Mathematics (4th edition, 1908) by W. W. Rouse Ball.
