= Flow rate =

Flow rate (interchangeable with 'flowrate') may refer to:

- Mass flow rate (ṁ or μ), the mass of a substance which passes per unit of time
- Volumetric flow rate (Q or $\dot V$), the volume of fluid which passes per unit time
  - Discharge (hydrology) (Q), volume rate of water flow that is transported through a given cross-sectional area, such as a river

== See also ==
- Flow measurement, a quantification of bulk fluid movement
