= Baghouse =

Pollution control device

A baghouse, also known as a baghouse filter, bag filter, or fabric filter is an air pollution control device and dust collector that removes particulates entrained in gas released from commercial processes. Power plants, steel mills, pharmaceutical producers, food manufacturers, chemical producers and other industrial companies often use baghouses to control emission of air pollutants. Baghouses came into widespread use in the late 1970s after the invention of high-temperature fabrics (for use in the filter media) capable of withstanding temperatures over 350 °F (177 °C).

Unlike electrostatic precipitators, where performance may vary significantly depending on process and electrical conditions, functioning baghouses typically have a particulate collection efficiency of 99% or better, even when particle size is very small.

== Operation ==
Most baghouses use long, cylindrical bags (or tubes) made of woven or felted fabric as a filter medium. For applications where there is relatively low dust loading and gas temperatures are 250 °F (121 °C) or less, pleated, nonwoven cartridges are sometimes used as filtering media instead of bags.

Dust-laden gas or air enters the baghouse and is directed into the baghouse compartment. The gas is drawn through the bags, either on the inside or the outside depending on cleaning method, and a layer of dust accumulates on the filter media surface until air can no longer move through it. The bags must be cleaned to allow filtration to work. Cleaning can take place while the baghouse is online (filtering) or is offline (in isolation). When the compartment is clean, normal filtering resumes. Baghouses are very efficient particulate collectors because of the dust cake formed on the surface of the bags. The fabric provides a surface on which dust collects through the following four mechanisms:

- Inertial collection – Dust particles strike the fibers placed perpendicular to the gas-flow direction instead of changing direction with the gas stream.
- Interception – Particles that do not cross the fluid streamlines come in contact with fibers because of the fiber size.
- Brownian movement – Submicrometre particles are diffused, increasing the probability of contact between the particles and collecting surfaces.
- Electrostatic forces – The presence of an electrostatic charge on the particles and the filter can increase dust capture.

To ensure the filter bags have a long lifespan they are commonly coated with a filter enhancer (pre-coat). The use of chemically inert limestone (calcium carbonate) is most common as it increases efficiency of dust collection (including fly ash) via formation of what is called a dustcake or coating on the surface of the filter media. This traps fine particulates but also provides protection for the bag itself from moisture, and oily or sticky particulates which can bind the filter media. Without a pre-coat the filter bag allows fine particulates to bleed through the bag filter system, especially during start-up, as the bag can only do part of the filtration leaving the finer parts to the filter enhancer dustcake.

=== Parts ===
Fabric filters generally have the following parts:

1. Clean plenum
2. Dusty plenum
3. Bag, cage, venturi assembly
4. Tubeplate
5. RAV/SCREW
6. Compressed air header
7. Blow pipe
8. Housing and hopper

== Types ==
Mechanical Shaker Baghouse

Reverse Air Baghouse

Pulse Jet Baghouse

Baghouses are classified by the cleaning method used. The three most common types of baghouses are mechanical shakers, reverse gas, and pulse jet.

=== Mechanical shakers ===
In mechanical-shaker baghouses, tubular filter bags are fastened onto a cell plate at the bottom of the baghouse and suspended from horizontal beams at the top. Dirty gas enters the bottom of the baghouse and passes through the filter, and the dust collects on the inside surface of the bags.

Cleaning a mechanical-shaker baghouse is accomplished by shaking the top horizontal bar from which the bags are suspended. Vibration produced by a motor-driven shaft and cam creates waves in the bags to shake off the dust cake.

Shaker baghouses range in size from small, handshaker devices to large, compartmentalized units. They can operate intermittently or continuously. Intermittent units can be used when processes operate on a batch basis; when a batch is completed, the baghouse can be cleaned. Continuous processes use compartmentalized baghouses; when one compartment is being cleaned, the airflow can be diverted to other compartments.

In shaker baghouses, there must be no positive pressure inside the bags during the shake cycle. Pressures as low as 5 pascals (0.00073 psi) can interfere with cleaning.

The air-to-cloth ratio for shaker baghouses is relatively low, hence the space requirements are quite high. However, because of the simplicity of design, they are popular in the minerals processing industry.

=== Reverse air ===
In reverse-air baghouses, the bags are fastened onto a cell plate at the bottom of the baghouse and suspended from an adjustable hanger frame at the top. Dirty gas flow normally enters the baghouse and passes through the bag from the inside, and the dust collects on the inside of the bags.

Reverse-air baghouses are compartmentalized to allow continuous operation. Before a cleaning cycle begins, filtration is stopped in the compartment to be cleaned. Bags are cleaned by injecting clean air into the dust collector in a reverse direction, which pressurizes the compartment. The pressure makes the bags collapse partially, causing the dust cake to crack and fall into the hopper below. At the end of the cleaning cycle, reverse airflow is discontinued, and the compartment is returned to the main stream.

The flow of the dirty gas helps maintain the shape of the bag. However, to prevent total collapse and fabric chafing during the cleaning cycle, rigid rings are sewn into the bags at intervals.

Space requirements for a reverse-air baghouse are comparable to those of a shaker baghouse; however, maintenance needs are somewhat greater.

=== Pulse jet ===
In reverse pulse-jet baghouses, individual bags are supported by a metal cage (filter cage), which is fastened onto a cell plate at the top of the baghouse. Dirty gas enters from the bottom of the baghouse and flows from outside to inside the bags. The metal cage prevents collapse of the bag. The pulse-jet baghouse was invented by MikroPul (currently part of the Nederman group and still a major supplier of filtration solutions) in the 1950s.

Bags are cleaned by a short burst of compressed air injected through a common manifold over a row of bags. The compressed air can be accelerated by a venturi nozzle mounted at the reverse-jet baghouse top of the bag. Since the duration of the compressed-air burst is short (about 0.1 seconds), it acts as a rapidly moving air bubble, traveling through the entire length of the bag and causing the bag surfaces to flex. This flexing of the bags breaks the dust cake, and the dislodged dust falls into a storage hopper below.

Reverse pulse-jet dust collectors can be operated continuously and cleaned without interruption of flow because the burst of compressed air is very small compared with the total volume of dusty air through the collector. On account of this continuous-cleaning feature, reverse-jet dust collectors are usually not compartmentalized.

The short cleaning cycle of reverse-jet collectors reduces recirculation and redeposit of dust. These collectors provide more complete cleaning and reconditioning of bags than shaker or reverse-air cleaning methods. Also, the continuous-cleaning feature allows them to operate at higher air-to-cloth ratios, so the space requirements are lower.

A digital sequential timer turns on the solenoid valve at set intervals to inject air into the blow pipe and clean the filters.

== Bag cleaning ==
=== Cleaning sequences ===
Two main sequence types are used to clean baghouses:

- Intermittent (periodic) cleaning
- Continuous cleaning

Intermittently cleaned baghouses are composed of many compartments or sections. Each compartment is periodically closed off from the incoming dirty gas stream, cleaned, and then brought back online. While the individual compartment is out of place, the gas stream is diverted from the compartment’s area. This makes shutting down the production process unnecessary during cleaning cycles.

Continuously cleaned baghouse compartments can be cleaned while actively filtering. A blast of compressed air momentarily interrupts the collection process to clean the bag. This is known as pulse jet cleaning. Pulse jet cleaning does not require taking compartments offline. Continuously cleaned baghouses are designed to prevent complete shutdown during bag maintenance and failures to the primary system.

=== Methods ===
==== Shaking ====
A rod connecting to the bag is powered by a motor. This provides motion to remove caked-on particles. The speed and motion of the shaking depends on the design of the bag and composition of the particulate matter. Generally shaking is horizontal. The top of the bag is closed and the bottom is open. When shaken, the dust collected on the inside of the bag is freed. No dirty gas flows through a bag while it is being cleaned. This redirection of air flow illustrates why baghouses must be compartmentalized.

==== Reverse air ====
Air flow gives the bag structure. Dirty air flows through the bag from the inside, allowing dust to collect on the interior surface. During cleaning, gas flow is restricted from a specific compartment. Without the flowing air, the bags relax. The cylindrical bag contains rings that prevent it from completely collapsing under the pressure of the air. A fan blows clean air in the reverse direction. The relaxation and reverse air flow cause the dust cake to crumble and release into the hopper. Upon the completion of the cleaning process, dirty air flow continues and the bag regains its shape.

==== Pulse jet ====
This type of baghouse cleaning (also known as pressure-jet cleaning) is the most common. It was invented and patented by MikroPul in 1956. A high pressure blast of air is used to remove dust from the bag. The blast enters the top of the bag tube, temporarily ceasing the flow of dirty air. The shock of air causes a wave of expansion to travel down the fabric. The flexing of the bag shatters and discharges the dust cake. The air burst is about 0.1 second and it takes about 0.5 seconds for the shock wave to travel down the length of the bag. Due to its rapid release, the blast of air does not interfere with contaminated gas flow. Therefore, pulse-jet baghouses can operate continuously and are not usually compartmentalized. The blast of compressed air must be powerful enough to ensure that the shock wave will travel the entire length of the bag and fracture the dust cake. The efficiency of the cleaning system allows the unit to have a much higher gas to cloth ratio (or volumetric throughput of gas per unit area of filter) than shaking and reverse air bag filters. This kind of filter thus requires a smaller area to admit the same volume of air.

==== Sonic ====
The least common type of cleaning method is sonic. Some baghouses have ultrasonic horns installed to provide supplementary vibration to increase dust cleaning. The horns, which generate high intensity sound waves at the low end of the ultrasonic spectrum, are turned on just before or at the start of the cleaning cycle to help break the bonds between particles on the filter media surface and aid in dust removal.

Sonic cleaning is commonly combined with another method of cleaning to ensure thorough cleaning.

==== Rotating cage ====
a mechanical cage inside a dusty bag moving to beat off the built-up material

Actuation of a rotating mechanical cage for dust removal on filter media

Although the principles of this method are basic, the rotating mechanical cage cleaning method is relatively new to the international market. This method can be visualized by reminding users of putting a floor covering rug on a clothes line and beating the dust out of it.

The rotating mechanical cage option consists of a fixed cage attached to the cell plate. Nested inside the cage holding the bag is a secondary cage that is allowed to rotate 90 degrees to impact the inside of the filter bag. This beating action accomplishes the same desired effect of creating a force that dislodges the particulates as the cage moves. This rotating action can be as adjusted to meet desired whipping effect on the inside of the bag.

==== Cartridge collectors ====
Cartridge collectors use perforated metal cartridges that contain a pleated, nonwoven filtering media, as opposed to woven or felt bags used in baghouses. The pleated design allows for a greater total filtering surface area than in a conventional bag of the same diameter, The greater filtering area results in a reduced air to media ratio, pressure drop, and overall collector size.

Cartridge collectors are available in single use or continuous duty designs. In single-use collectors, the dirty cartridges are changed and collected dirt is removed while the collector is off. In the continuous duty design, the cartridges are cleaned by the conventional pulse-jet cleaning system.

== Performance ==
Baghouse performance is dependent upon inlet and outlet gas temperature, pressure drop, opacity, and gas velocity. The chemical composition, moisture, acid dew point, and particle loading and size distribution of the gas stream are essential factors as well.

- Gas temperature – Fabrics are designed to operate within a certain temperature range. Fluctuation outside of these limits, even for a small period of time, can weaken, damage, or ruin the bags.
- Pressure drop – Baghouses operate most effectively within a certain pressure drop range. This spectrum is based on a specific gas volumetric flow rate.
- Opacity – Opacity measures the quantity of light scattering that occurs as a result of the particles in a gas stream. Opacity is not an exact measurement of the concentration of particles; however, it is a good indicator of the amount of dust leaving the baghouse.
- Gas volumetric flow rate – Baghouses are created to accommodate a range of gas flows. An increase in gas flow rates causes an increase in operating pressure drop and air-to-cloth ratio. These increases put more mechanical strain on the baghouses, resulting in more frequent cleanings and high particle velocity, two factors that shorten bag life.

== Design variables ==
Pressure drop, filter drag, air-to-cloth ratio, and collection efficiency are essential factors in the design of a baghouse.

- Pressure drop (ΔP) is the resistance to air flow across the baghouse. A high pressure drop corresponds with a higher resistance to airflow. Pressure drop is calculated by determining the difference in total pressure at two points, typically the inlet and outlet.
- Filter drag is the resistance across the fabric-dust layer.
- The air-to-cloth ratio (ft/min or cm/s) is defined as the amount of gas entering the baghouse divided by the surface area of the filter cloth.

=== Filter media ===
Fabric filter bags are oval or round tubes, typically 15–30 feet (4.6–9.1 m) long and 5 to 12 inches (130 to 300 mm) in diameter, made of woven or felted material.

Nonwoven materials are either felted or membrane. Nonwoven materials are attached to a woven backing (scrim). Felted filters contain randomly placed fibers supported by a woven backing material (scrim). In a membrane filter, a thin, porous membrane is bound to the scrim. High energy cleaning techniques such as pulse jet require felted fabrics.

Woven filters have a definite repeated pattern. Low energy cleaning methods such as shaking or reverse air allow for woven filters. Various weaving patterns such as plain weave, twill weave, or sateen weave, increase or decrease the amount of space between individual fibers. The size of the space affects the strength and permeability of the fabric. A tighter weave corresponds with low permeability and, therefore, more efficient capture of fine particles.

Reverse air bags have anti-collapse rings sewn into them to prevent pancaking when cleaning energy is applied. Pulse jet filter bags are supported by a metal cage, which keeps the fabric taut. To lengthen the life of filter bags, a thin layer of PTFE (teflon) membrane may be adhered to the filtering side of the fabric, keeping dust particles from becoming embedded in the filter media fibers.

Some baghouses use pleated cartridge filters, similar to what is found in home air filtration systems. This allows much greater surface area for higher flow at the cost of additional complexity in manufacture and cleaning.

== See also ==
- Cyclonic separation
- Dust collector
- Electrostatic precipitator
