= Volume flux =

Volume flux most often refers to:

- Volumetric flow rate, the volume of fluid which passes per unit time
- Volumetric flux, the rate of volume flow across a unit area
