= LI-COR Biosciences =

International biotech company

LI-COR, Inc.
- Type: Private
- Industry: Research / Design / Manufacturing
- Founded: 1971; 55 years ago
- Founder: William Biggs
- Headquarters: Lincoln, Nebraska, U.S.
- Key people: Thomas Reslewic (CEO)
- Products: Scientific Instruments, Measurement Systems and Software for Biological and Environmental Research
- Website: www.licor.com

LI-COR Biosciences is an international biotech company which designs, manufactures, and markets instruments, measurement systems, and software for biological and environmental research, and develops relevant measurement methodologies and techniques.

== Origins and history ==
LI-COR Biosciences was a privately held company based in Lincoln, Nebraska, until its acquisition by Battery Ventures in 2021. It was founded in 1971 under the name Lambda Instruments Corporation. The name was shortened to LI-COR, Inc., in 1978.

== Products and Applications ==
=== Biotechnology ===
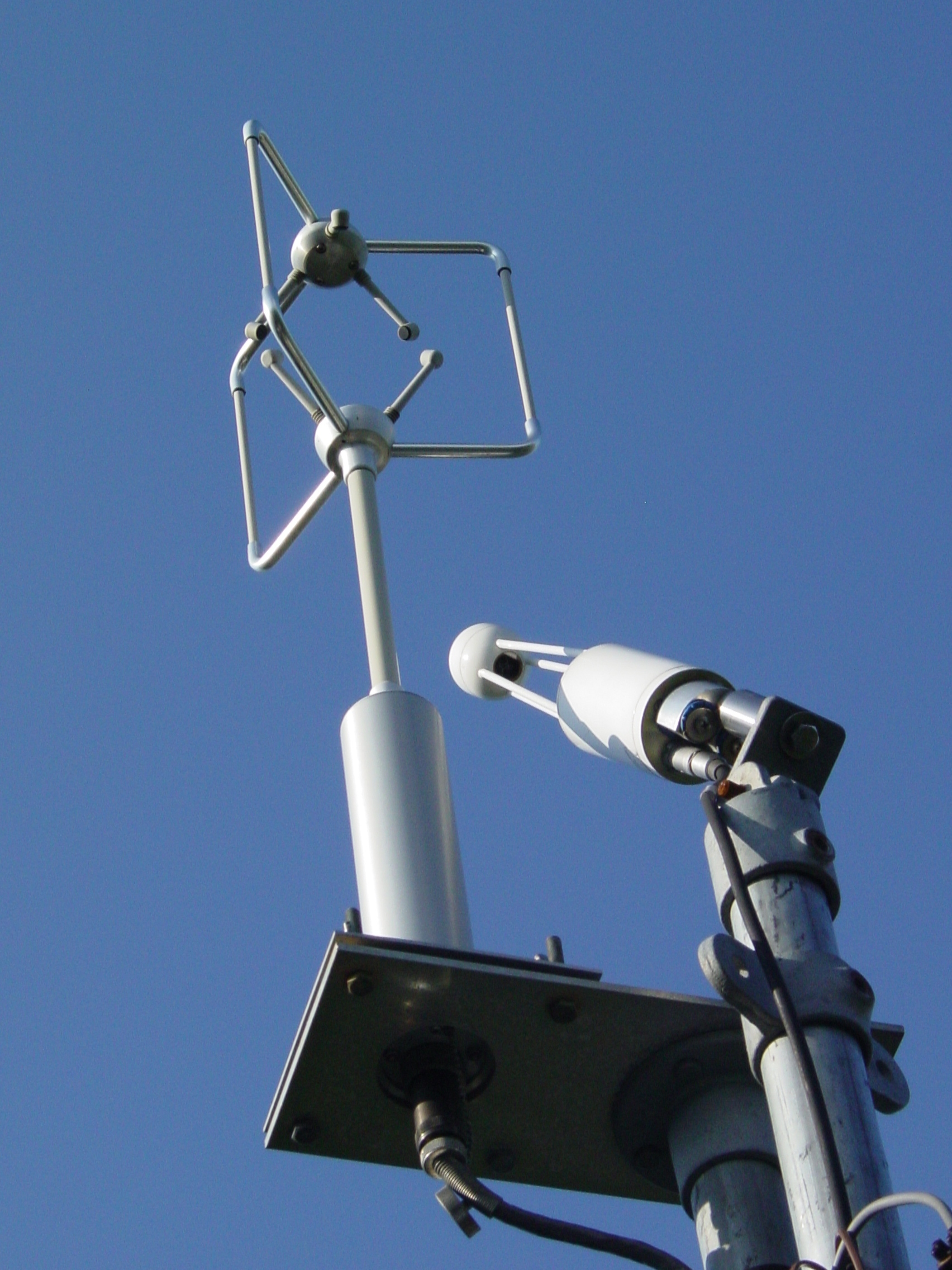
The LI-7500 (right) is used to measure CO_{2} and H_{2}O concentrations.

LI-COR biotechnology instruments, software and reagents, which are based on near-infrared fluorescent and chemiluminescent detection, are used in a large variety of assays, such as western blot assays and cell-based assays, as well as in vivo imaging and DNA analysis. Primary applications include cancer research, drug discovery, genomics research, neuroscience, cell biology, and education.

=== Environmental ===
LI-COR environmental instruments and software are used for photosynthesis research, greenhouse gas monitoring, greenhouse gas flux measurements, and soil respiration measurements. LI-COR also manufactures light sensors, leaf area meters, and plant canopy analyzers, all of which are used to make fundamental measurements in disciplines including plant physiology, climate change, agronomy (forestry and agriculture), and other areas of the natural sciences.

== Scientific contributions and recognition ==
LI-COR automated DNA sequencers were the primary systems used by Genoscope, the French National Sequencing Center to sequence chromosome 14 of the Human Genome Project.

Researchers affiliated with micrometeorological networks around the world use LI-COR carbon dioxide and water vapor analyzers to assess ecosystem greenhouse gas exchange with the eddy covariance technique. These networks include FluxNet and regional networks such as AmeriFlux, ICOS and AsiaFlux.

In 2010, the editors of R&D Magazine selected the LI-7700 Open Path CH_{4} Analyzer for an R&D 100 Award.

In 2013, the historic benchmark of increase in CO_{2} concentrations at 400 ppm was reported by the National Oceanic and Atmospheric Administration using LI-7000 Closed Path CO_{2}/H_{2}O gas analyzer.

The LI-6400/6400XT Portable Photosynthesis System is the most frequently cited photosynthesis system in peer-reviewed scientific literature.

== See also ==
- Image Studio Lite
