= Centrifugal pump selection and characteristics =

The basic function of a pump is to do work on a liquid. It can be used to transport and compress a liquid. In industries heavy-duty pumps are used to move water, chemicals, slurry, food, oil and so on. Depending on their action, pumps are classified into two types — Centrifugal Pumps and Positive Displacement Pumps. While centrifugal pumps impart momentum to the fluid by motion of blades, positive displacement pumps transfer fluid by variation in the size of the pump’s chamber. Centrifugal pumps can be of rotor or propeller types, whereas positive displacement pumps may be gear-based, piston-based, diaphragm-based, etc. As a general rule, centrifugal pumps are used with low viscosity fluids and positive displacement pumps are used with high viscosity fluids.

== Parameters and Definitions ==
Volume flow rate (Q), specifies the volume of fluid flowing through the pump per unit time. Thus, it gives the rate at which fluid travels through the pump. Given the density of the operating fluid, mass flow rate (ṁ) can also be used to obtain the volume flow rate. The relationship between the mass flow rate and volume flow rate (also known as the capacity) is given by:

$$\dot m = \rho \cdot Q$$

Where ρ is the operating fluid density. One of the most important considerations, as a consequence, is to match the rated capacity of the pump with the required flow rate in the system that we are designing.
Discharge Head, is the net head obtained at the outlet of a pump. For a centrifugal pump, the discharge pressure depends on the suction or inlet pressure as well, along with the fluid’s density. Thus, for the same flow rate of the fluid, we may have different values of discharge pressure depending on the inlet pressure. Thus, discharge head (the height which the fluid can reach after getting pumped) varies according to its operating conditions.
Total Head is the difference between the height to which the fluid can rise at the outlet and the height to which it can rise at the inlet for a centrifugal pump. This is a crucial parameter for pump selection and is a popularly used parameter for ascertaining industrial requirements. By eliminating the inlet head, we remove the effect of the supplied pressure to the pump and are left with only the pump’s energy (head) contribution to the fluid flow.

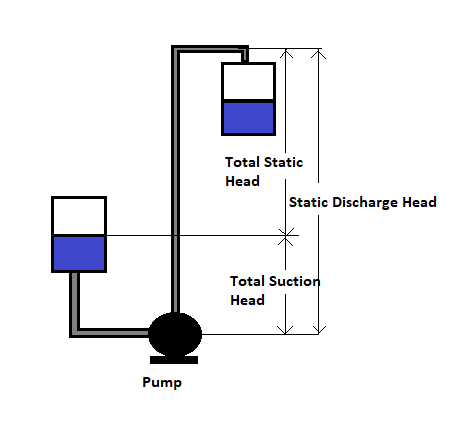
Schematic representation of pressure heads in a pump.

== Factors Affecting Pump Selection ==
Flow Rate – The flow rate is necessary to select a pump because the head characteristics of a pump will be affected by the flow rate of the system. It is necessary to importantly measure or ascertain this parameter, since the flow rate is critical in many industrial processes, especially in chemical industries.
Static Head – The difference between the inlet tank fluid surface elevation and the discharge tank fluid surface elevation.
Friction Head – The friction head accounts for the frictional losses in the pumping system. The value of the friction head can be found from available data-tables depending on the flow parameters such as fluid viscosity, pipe dimensions, flow rate, etc.
Total Head – It is obtained by adding the friction and static heads. It gives a measure of the amount of energy imparted by the pump to the fluid. Using the total head and the flow rate, the appropriate dynamic pump (centrifugal pump) can be selected.

== Selection Using Pump Characteristics ==
Whenever there is a need to select a pump for any industrial or personal requirement, it is important to determine the required total head for the operation and the required flow rate. All this data is important because each pump which is manufactured by manufacturer has a characteristic value of head and flow at which it leads to maximum efficiency operation. For example, in a process industry if there is a need to transport chemical liquids at a specific flow rate for a particular chemical reaction to take place then there is a need to ascertain both the dynamic head (which is related to the flow rate) and static head. After calculating both the head and the flow rate, the pump curves given by the manufacturer are referred and the pump giving the maximum efficiency at the operational condition is selected. It should however be noted that the best efficiency point is not the best operating point in practice, because the pump curve describes how a centrifugal pump performs in isolation from plant equipment. How it operates in practice is determined by the resistance of the system it is installed in.

=== Characteristic Pump Curves ===
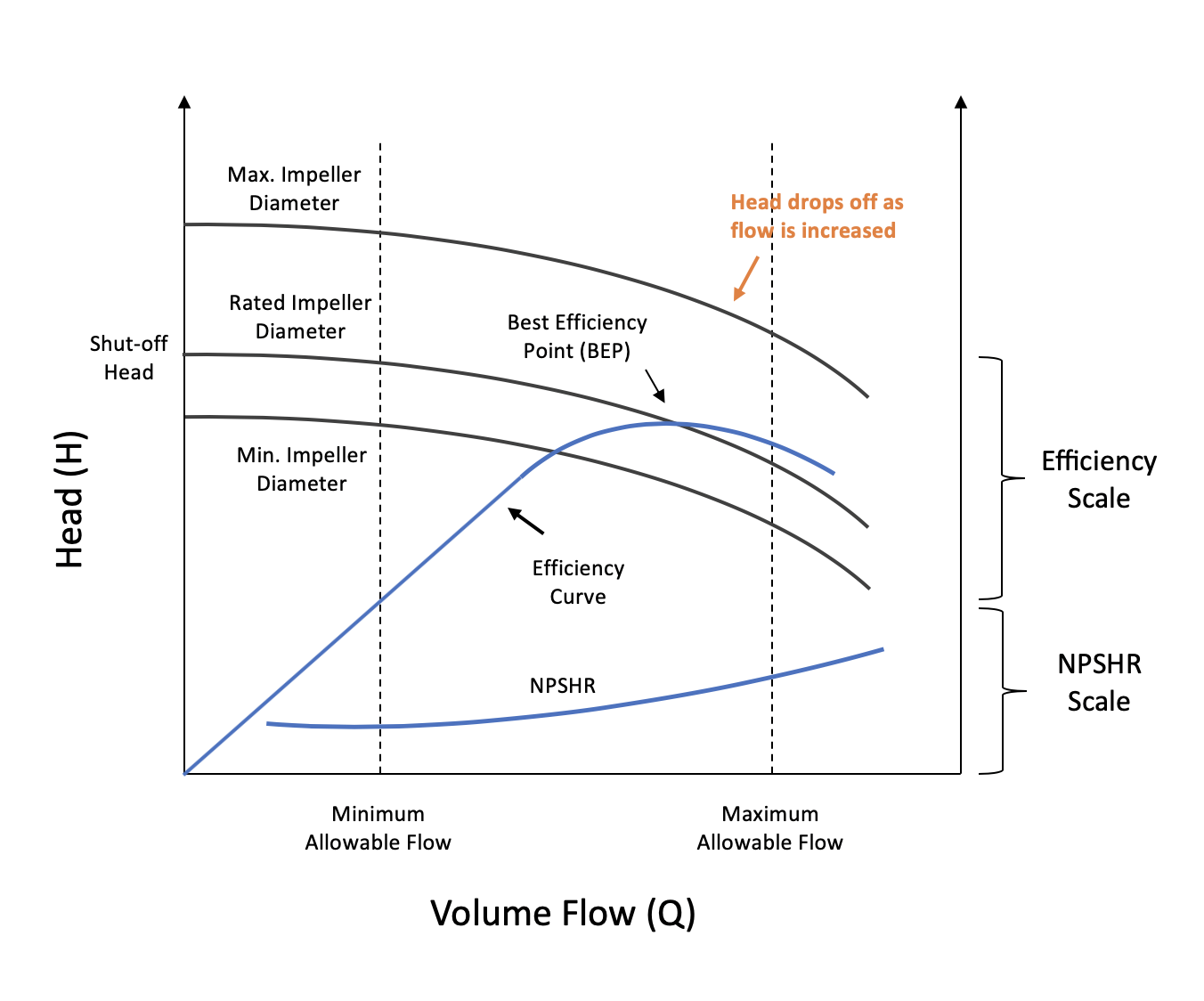
Pump Characteristic curve; the head produced reduces with the discharge of the pump.

Pump curves are quite useful in the pump selection, testing, operation and maintenance. Pump performance curve is a graph of differential head against the operating flow rate. They specify performance and efficiency characteristics. Performance tests are done on the pumps to verify the claims made by the pump maker. It is quite possible that with time in the plant, requirements of the process along with the infrastructure and conditions may change considerably. In that case pump curves are used to verify whether the pumps would still be the best fit for modified requirements.

=== Selecting Using Pump Curves ===
Pump performance curves are important indicators of pump characteristics provided by the manufacturer. These curves are fundamental in predicting the variation in the differential head across the pump, as the flow changes. However, such curves are not limited to the head, and variation in other parameters such as power, efficiency or NPSH with flow can also be shown on similar plots by the manufacturer.

Due to mechanical and power constraints head provided by the pump drops as it pushes more quantity of fluid. In other words, when there is an increase the flow rate (for the same impeller diameter), there is a drop in differential head that the pump is capable of providing. The two are related as follows: $H=A-BQ$
Here $A$ and $B$ depend on the geometric parameters and the rotational speed of the pump and are assumed to be constant for the purpose of comparison. However, this simple linear relationship undergoes modification on account of various losses and a non-linear, decreasing $H-Q$ relationship is seen in the pump characteristic curve.

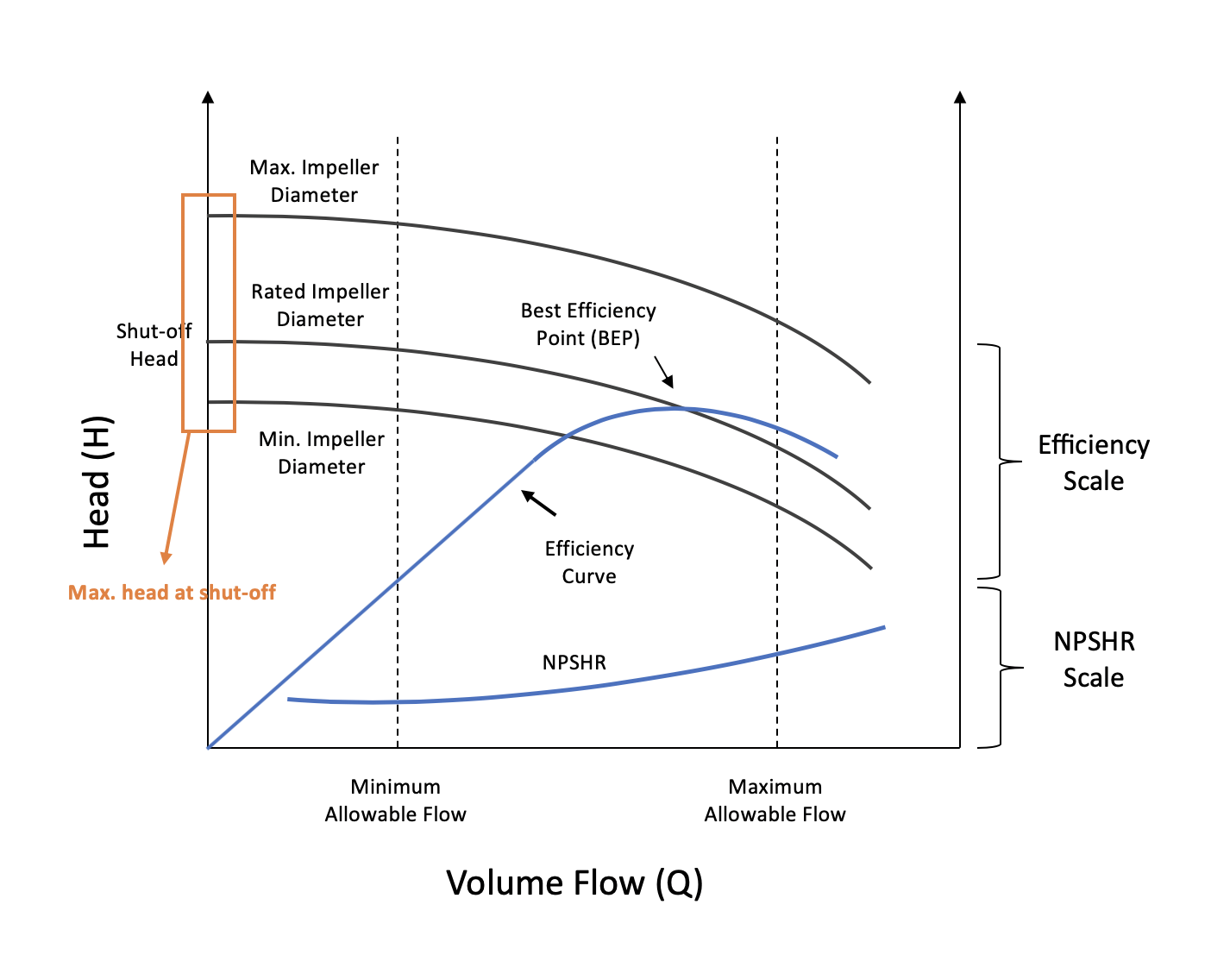
Pump characteristic curve; the shut-off heads are highlighted

From the curve, it is observed that even when the differential head drops off, the output obtained increases because the product of flow rate and head increases (recall that the net pump output is given by $P_o=\rho gHQ$ and the efficiency is $\eta =\rho gHQ /P_i$). This is due to the increase in flow rate. However, the reduction in the discharge head means that the pump consumes more power to push the additional fluid that we need (on account of the increased flow rate). After a specific point, known as the best efficiency point, the effect of reduction in the obtained head outweighs the increase in the flow rate. As a consequence, the power starts reducing hereafter, and the efficiency starts falling. Mathematically, the effect of flow rate on the efficiency is given by:
$\eta=k_1 C_Q-k_2 C_Q^3,$ where $C_Q=Q/ND^3$ is called the capacity constant, and $k_1$ and $k_2$ are constants that depend on the pump design and rotation speed.

Because of this contradicting feature a point of optimal efficiency is achieved for the pump. Our target should be to select pump which operates close to the maximum efficiency point for required operational requirement. This is the best efficiency point for pump and plotted on Pump Efficiency Curve.
