= SLM =

SLM may refer to:

== Companies ==
- SLM Corporation, or Sallie Mae, an American student loan company
- Swiss Locomotive and Machine Works, a Swiss company
- ICAO code for Surinaamse Luchtvaart Maatschappij, or Surinam Airways
- SLM International, now known as CCM, an ice hockey equipment manufacturer
- Stan Lee Media, an Internet company
- St. Louis Music, equipment distributor

== Science ==
- Selective laser melting, making metal parts
- Spatial light modulator in optical projection
- Standard litre per minute, a unit
- Small language model, a small scale language model in generative artificial intelligence

== Other ==
- Š-L-M (Shin-Lamedh-Mem), a Semitic triconsonantal root
- IATA code for Salamanca Airport, Spain
- Situational leadership model, a concept
- Postal code for Sliema, Malta
- Solomon Islands, ITU country code
- Sudan Liberation Movement/Army, a Sudanese rebel group
- Sustainable land management
