= Cubic metre per second =

SI unit of volumetric flow rate

cubic metre per second
- Unit system: SI
- Unit of: volumetric flow rate
- Symbol: m^{3}/s
- In SI base units: m^{3}·s^{−1}

The cubic metre per second or cubic meter per second in American English (symbol m^{3}⋅s^{−1} or m^{3}/s) is the unit of volumetric flow rate in the International System of Units (SI). It corresponds to the exchange or movement of the volume of a cube with sides of one metre (39.37 in) in length (a cubic meter, originally a stere) each second. It is popularly used for water flow, especially in rivers and streams, and fractions for HVAC values measuring air flow.

The term cumec is sometimes used as an acronym for full unit name, with the plural form cumecs also common in speech. It is commonly used between workers in the measurement of water flow through natural streams and civil works, but rarely used in writing.

Data in units of m^{3}⋅s^{−1} are used along the y-axis or vertical axis of a flow hydrograph, which describes the time variation of discharge of a river (the mean velocity multiplied by cross-sectional area). A moderately sized river discharges in the order of 100 m^{3}⋅s^{−1}.

== Conversions ==
1 cubic metre per second	=	1000	litres per second
	=	60	kilolitres per minute
	=	86.4	megalitres per day
	=	31.5576	gigalitres per year
	≈	219.969248	imperial gallons per second
	≈	264.172051	US gallons per second
	≈	35.314454	cubic feet per second
	≈	1.305	cubic yards per second
	≈	25566.497	acre-feet per year
	≈	1113676621	cubic feet per year
	≈	0.00757090916	cubic miles per year

== See also ==
- Standard litre per minute
- Conversion of units
- Volumetric flow rate
- Volumetric flux
- Cusec, shorthand for cubic feet per second
