= Standard cubic centimetres per minute =

Fluid flow rate unit

Standard cubic centimeters per minute (SCCM) is a unit used to quantify the flow rate of a fluid. 1 SCCM is identical to 1 cm³_{STP}/min. Another expression of it would be Nml/min. These standard conditions vary according to different regulatory bodies. One example of standard conditions for the calculation of SCCM is $T_n$ = 0 °C (273.15 K) and $p_n$ = 1.01 bar (14.72 psia) and a unity compressibility factor $Z_n$ = 1 (i.e., an ideal gas is used for the definition of SCCM). This example is for the semi-conductor-manufacturing industry.

== Conversion to mass flowrate and molar flowrate ==
For conversion purposes, it is useful to think of one SCCM as the mass flow rate of one cubic centimeter per minute of a fluid, typically a gas, at a density defined at some standard temperature, $T_n$, and pressure, $p_n$.

To convert one SCCM to the measure of mass flow rate in the SI system, kg/s, one relies in the fundamental relationship between mass flow rate and volumetric flow rate (see volumetric flow rate),

$$\dot m = \rho_n \dot q
,$$

where $\rho_n$ is density at some standard conditions, and an equation of state such as

$$\rho_n = \frac{p_n M}{Z_n R_u T_n }
,$$

with $M$ being the fluid molecular weight, $Z_n$ the fluid compressibility factor, and $R_u$ the universal gas constant. By including units of measurement between square brackets in the above relationship between $\dot m$ and $\dot q$ one obtains

$$\dot m \left[\frac{\rm {kg}}{\rm s} \right] = \rho_n \left[\frac{\rm kg}{\rm {m}^3} \right] \dot q \left[\frac{cm^3}{min}\right]
,$$

where $\dot m$ is in $kg/s$, $\rho_n$ in $kg/m^3$, and $\dot q$ is in $cm^3/min$. This expression facilitates choosing a comfortable one, to convert units by multiplying as here

$$\dot m \left[\frac{\rm {kg}}{\rm s} \right] = \rho_n \left[\frac{\rm kg}{\rm {m}^3} \right] \dot q \left[\frac{cm^3}{min}\right] \cdot 1 \left[ \frac{1 \, min}{60 \, s} \frac{1 m^3}{10^6 \, cm^3}\right]
.$$

Thereafter, by replacing $\rho_n$ with the above equation of state, one obtains

$$\dot m \left[\frac{kg}{s}\right] = \frac{p_n [Pa] M \left[ \frac{kg}{kmol}\right]}{Z_n R_u \left[\frac{J}{K kmol}\right] T_n [K]} \dot q \left[\frac{cm^3}{min}\right] \cdot 1 \left[ \frac{1 \, min}{60 \, s} \frac{1 m^3}{10^6 \, cm^3}\right]
.$$

Using this last relationship, one can convert a mass flow rate $\dot m$ in kg/s to volumetric flow rate $\dot q$ in the more familiar unit of SCCM with

$$1 \, \frac{kg}{s}
= 6\cdot 10^{7} \frac{Z_n R_u \left[\frac{J}{K kmol}\right] T_n [K]}{p_n [Pa] M \left[ \frac{kg}{kmol}\right] }
SCCM
,$$

and vice versa with

$$1 \, SCCM
= 1.6667\cdot 10^{-8} \frac{p_n [Pa] M \left[ \frac{kg}{kmol}\right] }{Z_n R_u \left[\frac{J}{K kmol}\right] T_n [K]}
\frac{kg}{s}
.$$

With this conversion from SCCM to kg/s, one can then use available unit calculators to convert kg/s to other units, such as g/s of the CGS system, or slug/s.

Based on the above formulas, the relationship between SCCM and molar flow rate in kmol/s is given by

$$1 \, \frac{kmol}{s}
= 6\cdot 10^{7} \frac{Z_n R_u \left[\frac{J}{K kmol}\right] T_n [K]}{p_n [Pa]  }
SCCM
,$$

and

$$1 \, SCCM
= 1.6667\cdot 10^{-8} \frac{p_n [Pa] }{Z_n R_u \left[\frac{J}{K kmol}\right] T_n [K]}
\frac{kmol}{s}
.$$

== Conversion examples ==
For some usage examples, consider the conversion of 1 SCCM to kg/s of a gas of molecular weight $M$, where $M$ is in kg/kmol. Furthermore, consider standard conditions of 101325 Pa and 273.15 K, and assume the gas is an ideal gas (i.e., $Z_n=1$). Using the unity bracket method (see conversion of units) one obtains:

$$1 \, {\cancel \text{SCCM}} \cdot \frac{ 1.6667\cdot 10^{-8} \frac{101325 [Pa] M \left[ \frac{kg}{kmol}\right] }{8314 \left[\frac{J}{K kmol}\right] 273.15 [K]} \frac{kg}{s} } { 1 \, {\cancel \text{SCCM}} } = 7.4364\cdot 10^{-10} \, \, M \left[ \frac{kg}{kmol}\right] \, \frac{kg}{s}
.$$

Considering nitrogen, which has a molecular weight of 28 kg/kmol, 1 SCCM of nitrogen in kg/s is given by:

$$7.4364\cdot 10^{-10} \, \cdot \, 28 = 2.0822\cdot 10^{-8} \frac{kg}{s}
.$$

To do the same for 1 SCCM of helium, which has a molecular weight of 4 kg/kmol, one obtains:

$$7.4364\cdot 10^{-10} \, \cdot \, 4 = 2.9745\cdot 10^{-9} \frac{kg}{s}
.$$

Notice that 1 SCCM of helium is less in kg/s than one SCCM of nitrogen.

To convert 50 SCCM of nitrogen with the above considerations one does

$$50 \, {\cancel \text{SCCM}} \cdot \frac{ 1.6667\cdot 10^{-8} \frac{101325 [Pa] 28 \left[ \frac{kg}{kmol}\right] }{8314 \left[\frac{J}{K kmol}\right] 273.15 [K]} \frac{kg}{s} } { 1 \, {\cancel \text{SCCM}} } = 1.04\cdot 10^{-6} \frac{kg}{s}
.$$

To convert 1 SCCM to kmol/s one does

$$1 \, {\cancel \text{SCCM}} \cdot \frac{ 1.6667\cdot 10^{-8} \frac{101325 [Pa] }{8314 \left[\frac{J}{K kmol}\right] 273.15 [K]} \frac{kg}{s} } { 1 \, {\cancel \text{SCCM}} } = 7.4364\cdot 10^{-10} \, \frac{kmol}{s}
.$$

== Related units of flow measurement ==
A unit related to the SCCM is the SLM or SLPM which stands for Standard litre per minute. Their conversion is

$$1 \, \text{SCCM}
= 10^{-3} \,
\text{SLM}
,$$

and

$$1 \, \text{SLM}
= 10^3 \,
\text{SCCM}
.$$

Another unit is the SCFM which stands for standard cubic feet per minute.

Yet another unit related to SCCM (and SLM) is the PCCM (and PLM) which stands for Perfect Cubic Centimeter per Minute (Perfect Litre per Minute). One PCCM is one SCCM when the gas is ideal. In other words, one PCCM is exactly the same as one SCCM if and only if $Z_n =1$ in the above relationships.
