= Flux footprint =

Flux footprint (also known as atmospheric flux footprint or footprint) is an upwind area where the atmospheric flux measured by an instrument is generated. Specifically, the term flux footprint describes an upwind area "seen" by the instruments measuring vertical turbulent fluxes, such that heat, water, gas and momentum transport generated in this area is registered by the instruments. Another frequently used term, fetch, usually refers to the distance from the tower when describing the footprint.

== Visualization of the concept ==
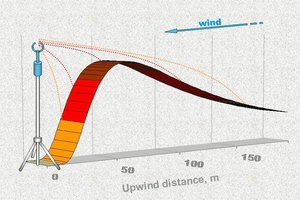
General concept of the flux footprint.

Consider an instrument measuring a flux of water (evapotranspiration) a few meters above the surface in a situation with no wind. In such a case, the instrument would measure evapotranspiration generated just underneath the instrument location and brought upwards by mostly non-turbulent exchange.

In a situation with a strong wind, the wind would blow air located under the instrument away. The wind would bring in air generated somewhere upwind and brought upwards to a large degree due to turbulent exchange. So, the water flux footprint was just under the instrument in the first case, and was somewhere upwind in the second case.

In the adjacent image, the darker the red color, the more contribution that is coming from the surface area a certain distance away for the instrument. Most of the contribution usually comes not from underneath the instrument or from kilometers away, but rather from somewhere in between. Size and shape of the footprint is also a dynamic area that changes with time.

== Mathematical foundation ==
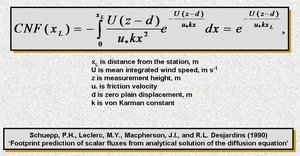
Mathematical representation of footprint.

Atmospheric transport can be looked at as a Lagrangian transport model. In such case, the footprint is the area of cumulative contribution to flux measurement computed from analytical solutions of the diffusion equation. For example, for near-neutral conditions, the mathematical representation of the flux footprint would be that seen in the image above.

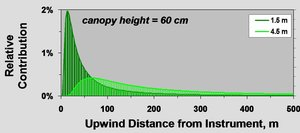
Relative contribution of the land surface area to the flux for two different measurement heights at near-neutral stability.

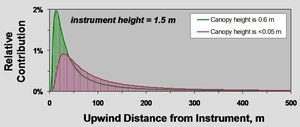
Relative contribution of the land surface area to the flux for two different surface roughnesses at near-neutral stability.

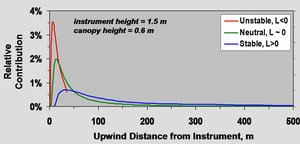
Relative contribution of the land surface area to the flux for two different cases of thermal stability.

== Main factors affecting flux footprint ==
Three main factors affecting the size and shape of flux footprint are:

- measurement height
- surface roughness
- atmospheric thermal stability

Increase in measurement height, decrease in surface roughness, and change in atmospheric stability from unstable to stable would lead to an increase in size of the footprint and move peak contribution away from the instrument. The opposite is also true. Decrease in measurement height, increase in surface roughness, and change in atmospheric stability from stable to unstable would lead to a decrease in size of the footprint and move peak contribution closer to the instrument.

=== Examples ===
To the right is an example of how the flux footprint is affected in all three cases, using the example of actual evapotranspiration flux (ET) measured over prairie in the summer season.

The top figure shows relative contribution of the land surface area to the flux for two different measurement heights at near-neutral stability. Please note that not only distance to the peak contributing was affected by a measurement height, but magnitude of the peak and overall distribution of the footprint was dramatically affected as well.

The middle figure shows relative contribution of the land surface area to the flux for two different surface roughnesses at near-neutral stability. Area under the curves on the plot above and on the two plots below sums up to nearly 100% of the flux contribution. The remaining few percent of flux are coming from an area beyond 500 m.

The bottom figure shows relative contribution of the land surface area to the flux for two different cases of thermal stability.

== See also ==
- FluxNet
- Eddy covariance
