= Mass flux =

Vector quantity describing mass flow rate through a given area

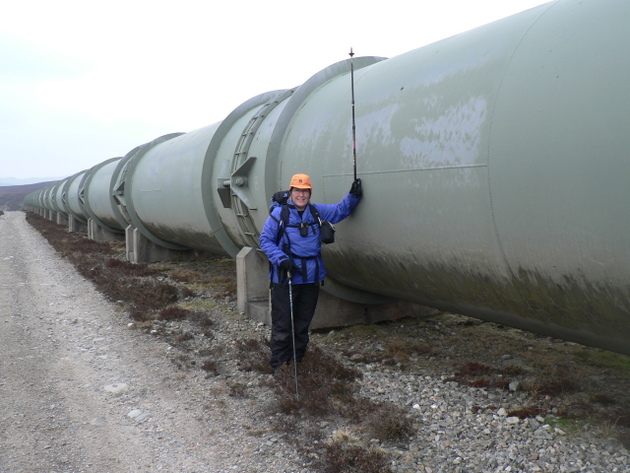
- Common symbols: j, J, q, Q, φ, Φ
- SI unit: kg⋅s^{−1}⋅m^{−2}
- Dimension: T^{-1}L^{-2}M

In physics and engineering, mass flux is the rate of mass flow per unit of area. It has dimension of mass per time-area (T^{-1}L^{-2}M) and its SI unit is kg⋅s^{−1}⋅m^{−2}. The common symbols are j, J, q or Q (in the Latin script) and φ or Φ (Greek phi, lowercase or capital), sometimes with subscript m to indicate mass is the flowing quantity.

This flux quantity is also known simply as "mass flow". "Mass flux" can also refer to an alternate form of flux in Fick's law that includes the molecular mass, or in Darcy's law that includes the mass density. Less commonly, the defining equation for mass flux in this article is used interchangeably with the defining equation in mass flow rate. (Note: For example, Fluid Mechanics, Schaum's et al uses the definition of mass flux as the equation in the mass flow rate article.)

== Definition ==
Mass flux is defined as the limit
$$j_\text{m} = \lim_{A \to 0} \frac{I_\text{m}}{A},$$
where
$$I_\text{m} = \lim_{\Delta t \to 0} \frac{\Delta m}{\Delta t} = \frac{dm}{dt}$$
is the mass current (flow of mass m per unit time t) and A is the area through which the mass flows.

For mass flux as a vector j_{m}, the surface integral of it over a surface S, followed by an integral over the time duration t_{1} to t_{2}, gives the total amount of mass flowing through the surface in that time (t_{2} − t_{1}):
$$\Delta m=\int_{t_1}^{t_2} \iint_S \mathbf{j}_\text{m} \cdot\mathbf{\hat{n}} \, dA \, dt.$$

The area required to calculate the flux is real or imaginary, flat or curved, either as a cross-sectional area or a surface.

For example, for substances passing through a filter or a membrane, the real surface is the (generally curved) surface area of the filter, macroscopically – ignoring the area spanned by the holes in the filter/membrane. The spaces would be cross-sectional areas. For liquids passing through a pipe, the area is the cross-section of the pipe, at the section considered.

The vector area is a combination of the magnitude of the area through which the mass passes through, A, and a unit vector normal to the area, $\mathbf{\hat{n}}$. The relation is $\mathbf{A} = A \mathbf{\hat{n}}$.

If the mass flux j_{m} passes through the area at an angle θ to the area normal $\mathbf{\hat{n}}$, then
$$\mathbf{j}_\text{m} \cdot \mathbf{\hat{n}} = j_\text{m}\cos\theta$$
where · is the dot product of the unit vectors. That is, the component of mass flux passing through the surface (i.e. normal to it) is j_{m} cos θ. While the component of mass flux passing tangential to the area is given by j_{m} sin θ, there is no mass flux actually passing through the area in the tangential direction. The only component of mass flux passing normal to the area is the cosine component.

== Example ==
Consider a pipe of flowing water. Suppose the pipe has a constant cross section and we consider a straight section of it (not at any bends/junctions), and the water is flowing steadily at a constant rate, under standard conditions. The area A is the cross-sectional area of the pipe. Suppose the pipe has radius r = 2 cm = 2 × 10^{−2} m. The area is then
$$A = \pi r^2.$$

To calculate the mass flux j_{m} (magnitude), we also need the amount of mass of water transferred through the area and the time taken. Suppose a volume V = 1.5 L = 1.5 × 10^{−3} m^{3} passes through in time t = 2 s. Assuming the density of water is ρ = 1000 kg⋅m^{−3}, we have:
$$\begin{align}
\Delta m &= \rho \Delta V \\
m_2 - m_1 &= \rho ( V_2 - V_1) \\
m &= \rho V \\
\end{align}$$
(since initial volume passing through the area was zero, final is V, so corresponding mass is m), so the mass flux is
$$j_\text{m} = \frac{\Delta m}{ A \Delta t} = \frac{\rho V}{ \pi r^2 t}.$$

Substituting the values gives:
$$j_\text{m} = \frac{ (\mathrm{1000\ kg{\cdot}m^{-3}}) \times (\mathrm{1.5 \times 10^{-3}\ m^{3}}) }{ \pi \times (\mathrm{2 \times 10^{-2}\ m})^2 \times (\mathrm{2\ s})} \approx \mathrm{596.8\ kg{\cdot}s^{-1}{\cdot}m^{-2}}.$$

== Equations for fluids ==
=== Alternative equation ===
Using the vector definition, mass flux is also equal to:
$$\mathbf{j}_{\rm m} = \rho \mathbf{u}$$
where:

- ρ = mass density,
- u = velocity field of mass elements flowing (i.e. at each point in space the velocity of an element of matter is some velocity vector u).

Sometimes this equation may be used to define j_{m} as a vector.

=== Mass and molar fluxes for composite fluids ===
==== Mass fluxes ====
In the case fluid is not pure, i.e. is a mixture of substances (technically contains a number of component substances), the mass fluxes must be considered separately for each component of the mixture.

When describing fluid flow (i.e. flow of matter), mass flux is appropriate. When describing particle transport (movement of a large number of particles), it is useful to use an analogous quantity, called the molar flux.

Using mass, the mass flux of component i is
$$\mathbf{j}_{{\rm m}, \, i} = \rho_i \mathbf{u}_i.$$

The barycentric mass flux of component i is
$$\mathbf{j}_{{\rm m}, \, i} = \rho \left ( \mathbf{u}_i - \langle \mathbf{u} \rangle \right ),$$
where $\langle \mathbf{u} \rangle$ is the average mass velocity of all the components in the mixture, given by
$$\langle \mathbf{u} \rangle = \frac{1}{\rho}\sum_i \rho_i \mathbf{u}_i = \frac{1}{\rho}\sum_i \mathbf{j}_{{\rm m}, \, i}$$
where

- ρ = mass density of the entire mixture,
- ρ_{i} = mass density of component i,
- u_{i} = velocity of component i.

The average is taken over the velocities of the components.

==== Molar fluxes ====
If we replace density ρ by the "molar density", concentration c, we have the molar flux analogues.

The molar flux is the number of moles per unit time per unit area, generally:
$$\mathbf{j}_{\rm n} = c \mathbf{u}.$$

So the molar flux of component i is (number of moles per unit time per unit area):
$$\mathbf{j}_{{\rm n}, \, i} = c_i \mathbf{u}_i$$
and the barycentric molar flux of component i is
$$\mathbf{j}_{{\rm n}, \, i} = c \left ( \mathbf{u}_i - \langle \mathbf{u} \rangle \right ),$$
where $\langle \mathbf{u} \rangle$ this time is the average molar velocity of all the components in the mixture, given by:
$$\langle \mathbf{u} \rangle = \frac{1}{n}\sum_i c_i \mathbf{u}_i = \frac{1}{c}\sum_i \mathbf{j}_{{\rm n}, \, i}.$$

== Usage ==
Mass flux appears in some equations in hydrodynamics, in particular the continuity equation:
$$\nabla \cdot \mathbf{j}_{\rm m} + \frac{\partial \rho}{\partial t} = 0,$$
which is a statement of the mass conservation of fluid. In hydrodynamics, mass can only flow from one place to another.

Molar flux occurs in Fick's first law of diffusion:
$$\nabla \cdot \mathbf{j}_{\rm n} = -\nabla \cdot D \nabla n$$
where D is the diffusion coefficient.

== See also ==
- Mass-flux fraction
- Flux
- Fick's law
- Darcy's law
- Airy wave theory § Wave mass flux and wave momentum
- Defining equation (physical chemistry)
- Momentum density
