= Image Studio Lite =

Software for Western blot analysis

- Developer: LI-COR Biosciences
- Stable release: 5.0
- Operating system: Windows 7, 8, and 8.1; Mac OS 10.9+
- Website: www.licor.com/bio/products/software/image_studio_lite/

Image Studio™ Lite is free image processing software used for quantitation of Western blot images and images from related experiments.

As of 2021, Image Studio Lite has been discontinued and is no longer available for download. In its place, LICOR has released Empiria Studio, a commercial product. It is unclear from this announcement whether Empiria Studio will support acquisition for Odyssey FC imaging systems previously using Image Studio or if licenses will be granted to owners of machines previously using Image Studio.

== Overview ==
The primary function of Image Studio Lite is to quantitate relative abundance of proteins on a Western blot or DNA/RNA in an electrophoresis gel from an image of the blot or gel.

== History ==
Release history of Image Studio Lite software:

Version	Release date	Compatibility
Image Studio Lite 5.0	March 3, 2015	Windows: 7, 8, 8.1; Mac OS: 10.9 or 10.10
Image Studio Lite 4.0	March 3, 2014	Windows: 7, 8, 8.1; Mac OS: 10.8 or 10.9
Image Studio Lite 3.1	February 1, 2013	Windows: 7, XP, Vista; Mac OS: 10.6, 10.7, 10.8

== See also ==
- ImageJ
