= Standard litre per minute =

Unit of volumetric flow rate of a gas at STP

The standard liter per minute (SLM or SLPM) is a unit of (molar or) mass flow rate of a gas at standard conditions for temperature and pressure (STP), which is most commonly practiced in the United States, whereas European practice revolves around the Normal temperature and pressure (NTP).

Definition of standard conditions
Standard	Absolute Pressure	Temperature
STP (until 1982)	101.325 kPa (1 atm, 14.696 psi)	273.15 K (0 °C, 32 °F)
STP (since 1982)	100 kPa (1 bar, 14.504 psi)	273.15 K (0 °C, 32 °F)
NTP	101.325 kPa (1 atm, 14.696 psi)	293.15 K (20 °C, 68 °F)

Conversions between each volume flow metric are calculated using the following formulas:

Prior to 1982,

$$1\, \mathrm{LPM} = (.001/60)~\mathrm{m^{3}}/\mathrm{s}  = 1\, \mathrm{NLPM} \cdot  \frac{T_\text{gas}}{293.15\,\mathrm{K}} \cdot \frac{14.696\,\text{psi}}{P_\text{gas}} = 1\, \mathrm{SLPM} \cdot \frac{T_\text{gas}}{273.15\,\mathrm{K}} \cdot \frac{14.696\,\text{psi}}{P_\text{gas}}$$

Post 1982,

$$1\, \mathrm{LPM} = (.001/60)~\mathrm{m^{3}}/\mathrm{s}  = 1\, \mathrm{NLPM} \cdot  \frac{T_\text{gas}}{293.15\,\mathrm{K}} \cdot \frac{14.696\,\text{psi}}{P_\text{gas}} = 1\, \mathrm{SLPM} \cdot \frac{T_\text{gas}}{273.15\,\mathrm{K}} \cdot \frac{14.504\,\text{psi}}{P_\text{gas}}$$

$1\, \mathrm{SLPM} = 1\, \mathrm{NLPM} \cdot \frac{273.15\,\mathrm{K}}{293.15\,\mathrm{K}} \cdot \frac{14.696\,\text{psi}}{14.504\,\text{psi}} \approx 0.94411\, \mathrm{NLPM}$

assuming zero degree Celsius reference point for STP when using SLPM, which differs from the "room" temperature reference for the NLPM standard. These methods are used due to differences in environmental temperatures and pressures during data collection.

In the SI system of units, the preferred unit for volumetric flow rate is cubic meter per second, equivalent to 60,000 liters per minute. If the gas is to be considered as an ideal gas, then SLPM can be expressed as mole per second using the molar gas constant $R$ = 8.314510 J⋅K^{−1}⋅mol^{−1}: $1\, \mathrm{SLPM} = \frac{0.001 \times 10^5}{60 \cdot 8.314510 \cdot 273.15} = 0.00073386$ mol/s.

== See also ==
- Flow measurement
- Gas laws
- Standard cubic foot (SCF)
- Standard cubic feet per minute (SCFM)
