= Eddy covariance =

Atmospheric measurement technique

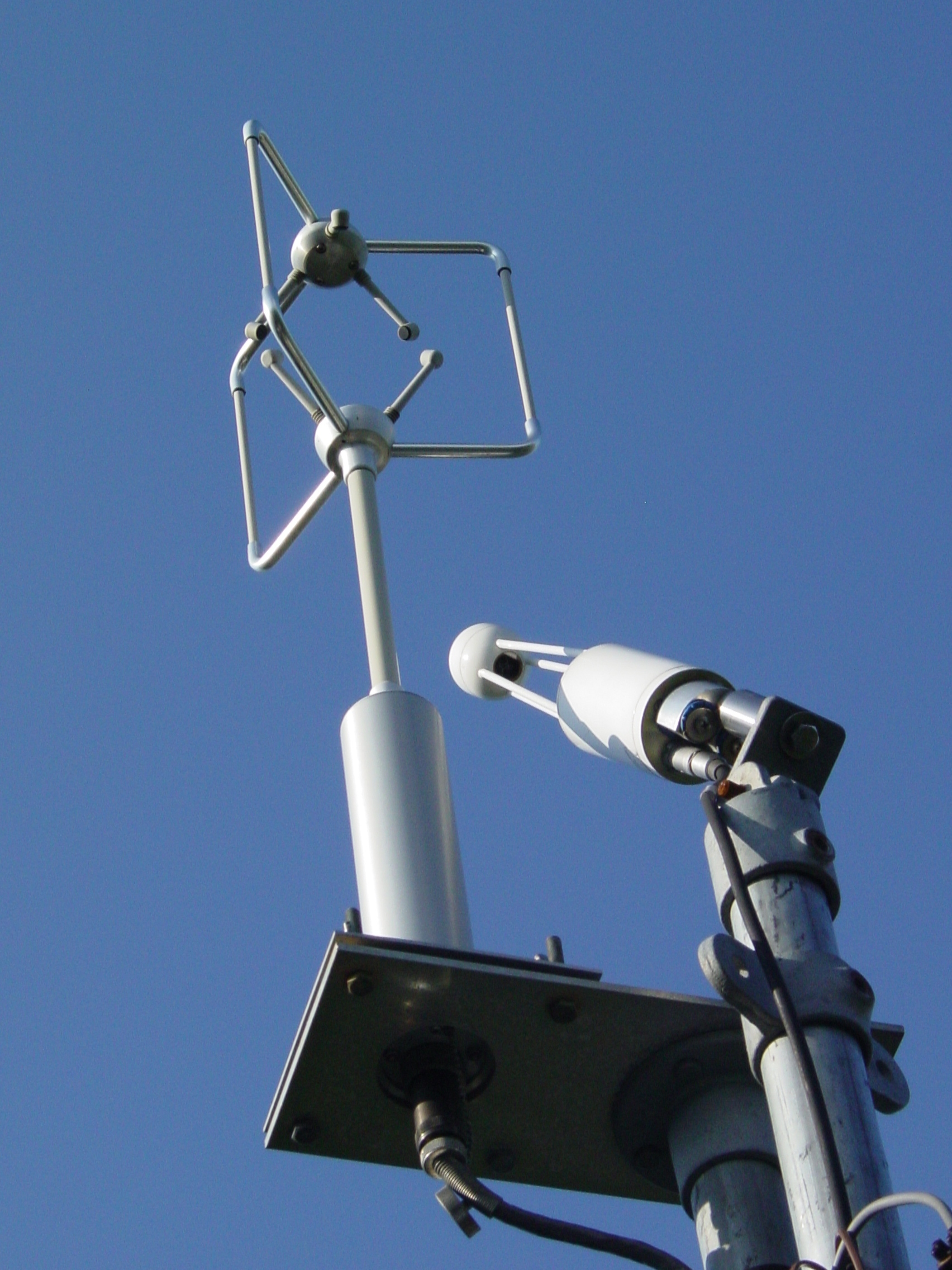
Eddy covariance system consisting of an ultrasonic anemometer and infrared gas analyser.

The eddy covariance (also known as eddy correlation and eddy flux) is a key atmospheric measurement technique to measure and calculate vertical turbulent fluxes within atmospheric boundary layers. The method analyses high-frequency wind and scalar atmospheric data series, gas, energy, and momentum, which yields values of fluxes of these properties. It is a statistical method used in meteorology and other applications (micrometeorology, oceanography, hydrology, agricultural sciences, industrial and regulatory applications, etc.) to determine exchange rates of trace gases over natural ecosystems and agricultural fields, and to quantify gas emissions rates from other land and water areas. It is frequently used to estimate momentum, heat, water vapour, carbon dioxide and methane fluxes.

The technique is also used extensively for verification and tuning of global climate models, mesoscale and weather models, complex biogeochemical and ecological models, and remote sensing estimates from satellites and aircraft. The technique is mathematically complex, and requires significant care in setting up and processing data. To date, there is no uniform terminology or a single methodology for the eddy covariance technique, but much effort is being made by flux measurement networks (e.g., FluxNet, Ameriflux, ICOS, CarboEurope, Fluxnet Canada, OzFlux, NEON, and iLEAPS) to unify the various approaches.

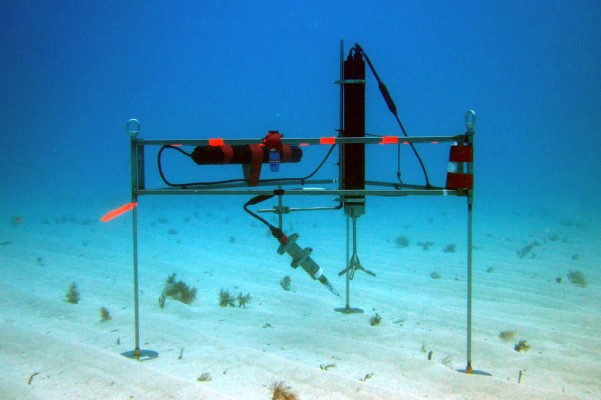
An eddy correlation instrument measuring oxygen fluxes in benthic environments.

The technique has additionally proven applicable under water to the benthic zone for measuring oxygen fluxes between the sea floor and overlying water. In these environments, the technique is generally known as the eddy correlation technique, or just eddy correlation. Oxygen fluxes are extracted from raw measurements largely following the same principles as used in the atmosphere, and they are typically used as a proxy for carbon exchange, which is important for local and global carbon budgets. For most benthic ecosystems, eddy correlation is the most accurate technique for measuring in-situ fluxes. The technique's development and its applications under water remains a fruitful area of research.

== Physical principles ==
Air flow can be imagined as a horizontal flow of numerous rotating eddies, that is, turbulent vortices of various sizes, with each eddy having horizontal and vertical components.

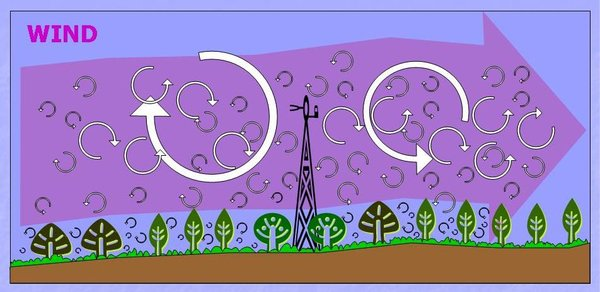

Vertical movement of the components can be measured from a tower. At one physical point on the tower, at time 1, eddy 1 moves parcel of air c_{1} down at speed $w_1$. Then, at time 2, eddy 2 moves parcel c_{2} up at speed $w_2$. Each parcel has gas concentration, pressure, temperature, and humidity. If these factors, along with the speed are known, we can determine the vertical flux. For example, if one knew how many molecules of water went down with eddies at time 1, and how many molecules went up with eddies at time 2, at the same point, one could calculate the vertical flux of water at this point over this time. So, vertical flux can be presented as a covariance of the vertical wind velocity and the concentration of the entity of interest.

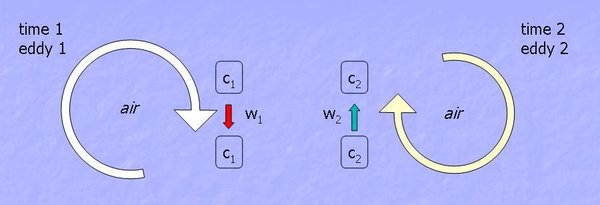

The 3D wind and another variable (usually gas concentration, temperature or momentum) are decomposed into mean and fluctuating components. The covariance is calculated between the fluctuating component of the vertical wind and the fluctuating component of gas concentration. The measured flux is proportional to the covariance.

The area from which the detected eddies originate is described probabilistically and called a flux footprint. The flux footprint area is dynamic in size and shape, changing with wind direction, thermal stability and measurements height, and has a gradual border.

The effect of sensor separation, finite sampling length, sonic path averaging, as well as other instrumental limitations, affect frequency response of the measurement system and may need a co-spectral correction, especially noticeable with closed-path instruments and at low heights below 1 to 1.5 m.

== Mathematical formulation ==
In mathematical terms, eddy flux F is computed as a covariance between instantaneous deviation in vertical wind speed ($w'$) from the mean value ($\bar{w}$) and instantaneous deviation in gas concentration, mixing ratio ($s'$), from its mean value ($\bar{s}$), multiplied by mean air density ($\rho_a$). Several mathematical operations and assumptions, including Reynolds decomposition, are involved in getting from physically complete equations of the turbulent flow to practical equations for computing "eddy flux," as shown below.

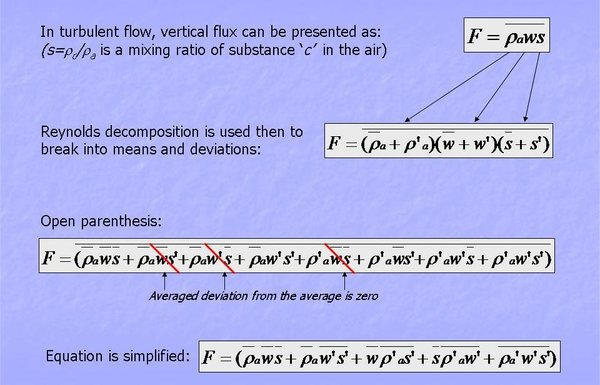

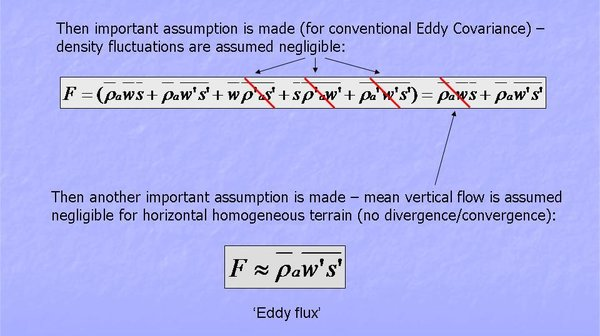

== Major assumptions ==
- Measurements at a point can represent an upwind area
- Measurements are done inside the boundary layer of interest
- Fetch/flux footprint is adequate – fluxes are measured only at area of interest
- Flux is fully turbulent – most of the net vertical transfer is done by eddies
- Terrain is horizontal and uniform: average of fluctuations is zero; density fluctuations negligible; flow convergence & divergence negligible
- Instruments can detect very small changes at high frequency, ranging from minimum of 5 Hz and to 40 Hz for tower-based measurements

== Software ==
As of 2011 there were many software programs to process eddy covariance data and derive quantities such as heat, momentum, and gas fluxes. The programs range significantly in complexity, flexibility, number of allowed instruments and variables, help system and user support. Some programs are open-source software, while others are closed-source or proprietary.

Examples include commercial software with free licence for non-commercial use such as EddyPro; open-source free programs such as ECO_{2}S, InnFLUX, and ECpack; free closed-source packages such as EdiRe, TK3, Alteddy, and EddySoft.

== Uses ==
Common uses:

- Greenhouse gas emissions
- Carbon dioxide emission monitoring
- Methane emissions monitoring
- Measuring water loss, evapotranspiration
- Instantaneous water use efficiency
- Instantaneous radiation use efficiency

Novel uses:

- Precision irrigation, precision agriculture
- Carbon sequestration and capture monitoring, with research by scientists like Ram Ray integrating eddy covariance data with satellite remote sensing to quantify carbon fluxes over large areas.
- Landfill gas emissions into the atmosphere
- Emissions of gases displaced by hydraulic fracturing into the atmosphere
- Gas leak detection and location
- Methane emission from permafrost regions
- Biogenic VOCs emission
- Reactive trace gas exchange flux measurement

== Common applications ==
=== Evapotranspiration ===
Remote sensing is an approach to modeling evapotranspiration using an energy balance and the latent heat flux to find evapotranspiration rates. Evapotranspiration (ET) is a part of the water cycle, and accurate ET readings are important to local and global models to manage water resources. ET rates are an important part of research in hydrology related fields, as well as for farming practices. MOD16 is an example of a program which measures ET best for temperate climates.

=== Micrometeorology ===
Micrometeorology focuses climate study on the specific vegetation canopy scale, again with applications to hydrological and ecologic research. In this context, eddy covariance can be used to measure heat mass flux in the boundary surface layer, or in the boundary layer surrounding the vegetation canopy. The effects of turbulence may for example be of specific interest to climate modelers or those studying the local ecosystem. Wind speed, turbulence, and mass (heat) concentration are values that could be recorded in a flux tower. Through measurements related to eddy covariance properties such as roughness coefficients may be empirically calculated, with applications to modeling.

=== Wetland ecosystems ===
Wetland vegetation varies widely and varies from plant to plant ecologically. Primary plant existence in wetlands can be monitored by using eddy covariance technology in conjunction with nutrient supply information by monitoring net CO_{2} and H_{2}O fluxes. Readings can be taken from flux towers over a number of years to determine water use efficiency among others.

=== Greenhouse gases and their warming effect ===
Fluxes of greenhouse gases from vegetation and agricultural fields can be measured by eddy covariance as referenced in micrometeorology section above. By measuring vertical turbulent flux of gas states of H_{2}O, CO_{2}, heat, and CH_{4} among other volatile organic compounds monitoring equipment can be used to infer canopy interaction. Landscape wide interpretations can be then inferred using the above data. High operational cost, weather limitations (some equipment is better suited for certain climates), and their resulting technical limitations may limit measurement accuracy.

=== Vegetation production in terrestrial ecosystems ===
Vegetation production models require accurate ground observations, in this context from eddy covariant flux measurement. Eddy covariance is used to measure the net primary production, and gross primary productions of plant populations. Advancements in technology have allowed for minor fluctuations resulting in a scale of 100-2000 meter measurements of air mass and energy readings. Study of the carbon cycle on vegetated growth and production is vitally important to both growers and scientists. Using such information carbon flux between ecosystems and the atmosphere can be observed, with applications ranging from climate change to weather models.

== Related methods ==
=== Eddy accumulation ===
==== True eddy accumulation ====
The true eddy accumulation technique can be used to measure fluxes of trace gases for which there are no fast enough analysers available, thus where the eddy covariance technique is unsuitable. The basic idea is that upwards moving air parcels (updrafts) and downwards moving air parcels (downdrafts) are sampled proportionally to their velocity into separate reservoirs. A slow response gas analyser can then be used to quantify the average gas concentrations in both updraft and downdraft reservoirs.

==== Relaxed eddy accumulation ====
The main difference between the true and the relaxed eddy accumulation technique is that the latter samples air with a constant flow rate that is not proportional to the vertical wind speed.

== See also ==
- Eddy (fluid dynamics)
- Ecosystem respiration
- Evaporation
- Evapotranspiration
- Greenhouse gas emissions
- Heat flux
- FluxNet
- Latent heat flux
- Transpiration
- Benthic Lander
