= Air-to-cloth ratio =

Variable

The air-to-cloth ratio is the volumetric flow rate of air (m^{3}/minute; SI m^{3}/second) flowing through a dust collector's inlet duct divided by the total cloth area (m^{2}) in the filters. The result is expressed in units of velocity.

$$v = {V / \Delta t \over {A}}$$

The air-to-cloth ratio is typically between 1.5 and 3.5 metres per minute, mainly depending on the concentration of dust loading.
