= FLUXNET =

Global network of micrometeorological towers

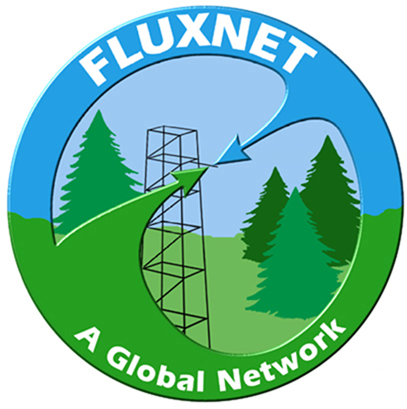
The Fluxnet Logo

FLUXNET is a global network of micrometeorological tower sites that use eddy covariance methods to measure the exchanges of carbon dioxide, water vapor, and energy between the biosphere and atmosphere. FLUXNET is a global 'network of regional networks' that serves to provide an infrastructure to compile, archive and distribute data for the scientific community. The most recent FLUXNET data product, FLUXNET2015, is hosted by the Lawrence Berkeley National Laboratory (USA) and is publicly available for download. Currently there are over 1000 active and historic flux measurement sites.

FLUXNET works to ensure that different flux networks are calibrated to facilitate comparison between sites, and it provides a forum for the distribution of knowledge and data between scientists. Researchers also collect data on site vegetation, soil, trace gas fluxes, hydrology, and meteorological characteristics at the tower sites.

== History and Background ==
FLUXNET started in 1997 and has grown from a handful of sites in North America and Europe to a current population exceeding 260 registered sites world-wide. Today, FLUXNET consists of regional networks in North America (AmeriFlux, Fluxnet-Canada, NEON), South America (LBA), Europe (CarboEuroFlux, ICOS), Australasia (OzFlux), Asia (China Flux, and Asia Flux) and Africa (AfriFlux). At each tower site, the eddy covariance flux measurements are made every 30 minutes and are integrated on daily, monthly and annual time scales. The spatial scale of the footprint at each tower site reaches between 200 m and a kilometer.

An overarching intent of FLUXNET, and its regional partners, is to provide data that can be used to validate terrestrial carbon fluxes derived from sensors on NASA satellites, such as TERRA and AQUA, and from biogeochemical models. To achieve this overarching goal, the objectives and priorities of FLUXNET have evolved as the network has grown and matured. During the initial stages of FLUXNET, the priority of their research was to develop value-added products, such as gap-filled data sets of net ecosystem productivity, NEP, evaporation, energy exchange and meteorology. The rationales for this undertaking were: 1) to compute daily, monthly and annual sums of net carbon, water and energy exchange; and 2) to produce continuous datasets for the execution and testing of a variety of biogeochemical/biophysical/ecosystem dynamic models and satellite-based remote sensing algorithms.

During the second stage of FLUXNET the research priority involved the decomposition of NEE measurements into component fluxes such as GPP and ecosystem respiration, R_{eco}. This step is required for FLUXNET to be a successful tool for validating MODIS-based estimate of terrestrial carbon exchange; algorithms driven by satellite-based remote sensing instruments are unable to assess NEE directly, and instead compute GPP or NPP. In the intervening years, FLUXNET scientists have used the flux-component datasets (GPP, R_{eco}) to assess how canopy photosynthesis and ecosystem respiration vary as a function of: 1) season; 2) plant functional type; and 3) environmental drivers.

While these initial studies have contributed significantly towards understanding the physiology of whole ecosystems, they only represent an initial step towards the future evolution and productivity of FLUXNET. For example, the majority of the early work was produced with a subset of field sites, which was heavily biased towards coniferous and deciduous forests. With the continued growth and extended duration of the network, many new opportunities, relating to the spatial/temporal aspects of carbon dioxide exchange, remain to be explored. First, FLUXNET has expanded to include broader representation of vegetation types and climates. The network now includes numerous tower sites over tropical and alpine forests, savanna, chaparral, tundra, grasslands, wetlands and an assortment of agricultural crops. Second, the scope of many studies over deciduous and conifer forests has expanded. Several contributing research groups are conducting chronosequence studies associated with disturbance by fire and logging. From this work, scientists are learning that information on disturbance needs to be incorporated into model schemes that rely on climate drivers and plant functional type to upscale of tower fluxes to landscapes and regions—adding another level of complexity. Third, FLUXNET is partnering with other groups that are measuring the changes in phenology with networks of digital cameras, soil moisture and methane fluxes.

Today, with many datasets extending beyond two decades, FLUXNET has the opportunity to provide data that is necessary to assess the impacts of climate and ecosystem factors on inter-annual variations and trends of carbon dioxide and water vapor fluxes.

The sharing of data has also been instrumental in developing techniques that use machine learning methods and combine data streams from FLUXNET, remote sensing and gridded data products to produce maps of carbon and water fluxes.
