= Mass flow rate =

Mass of a substance which passes per unit of time

- Common symbols: $\dot{m}$
- SI unit: kg/s
- Dimension: $\mathsf{MT^{-1}}$

In physics and engineering, mass flow rate is the rate at which mass of a fluid passes through a surface over time. Its unit is kilogram per second (kg/s) in SI units, and slug per second or pound per second in US customary units. The common symbol is $\dot{m}$ (pronounced "m-dot"), although sometimes $\mu$ (Greek lowercase mu) is used.

Sometimes, mass flow rate as defined here is termed "mass flux" or "mass current". (Note: See, for example, Schaum's Outline of Fluid Mechanics.) Confusingly, "mass flow" is also a term for mass flux, the rate of mass flow per unit of area.

== Formulation ==
Mass flow rate is defined by the limit
$$\dot{m} = \lim_{\Delta t \to  0} \frac{\Delta m}{ \Delta t} = \frac{dm}{dt},$$
i.e., the flow of mass $\Delta m$ through a surface per time $\Delta t$.

The overdot on $\dot{m}$ is Newton's notation for a time derivative. Since mass is a scalar quantity, the mass flow rate (the time derivative of mass) is also a scalar quantity. The change in mass is the amount that flows after crossing the boundary for some time duration, not the initial amount of mass at the boundary minus the final amount at the boundary, since the change in mass flowing through the area would be zero for steady flow.

== Alternative equations ==
Illustration of volume flow rate. Mass flow rate can be calculated by multiplying the volume flow rate by the mass density of the fluid, ρ. The volume flow rate is calculated by multiplying the flow velocity of the mass elements, v, by the cross-sectional vector area, A.

Mass flow rate can also be calculated by

$$\dot m = \rho \cdot \dot V = \rho \cdot \mathbf{v} \cdot \mathbf{A} = \mathbf{j}_\text{m} \cdot \mathbf{A},$$

where

- $\dot V$ or $Q$ = volume flow rate,
- $\rho$ = mass density of the fluid,
- $\mathbf{v}$ = flow velocity of the mass elements,
- $\mathbf{A}$ = cross-sectional vector area/surface,
- $\mathbf{j}_\text{m}$ = mass flux.

The above equation is only true for a flat, plane area. In general, including cases where the area is curved, the equation becomes a surface integral:
$$\dot m = \iint_A \rho \mathbf{v} \cdot d\mathbf{A} = \iint_A \mathbf{j}_\text{m} \cdot d\mathbf{A}.$$

The area required to calculate the mass flow rate is real or imaginary, flat or curved, either as a cross-sectional area or a surface, e.g. for substances passing through a filter or a membrane, the real surface is the (generally curved) surface area of the filter, macroscopically - ignoring the area spanned by the holes in the filter/membrane. The spaces would be cross-sectional areas. For liquids passing through a pipe, the area is the cross-section of the pipe, at the section considered. The vector area is a combination of the magnitude of the area through which the mass passes through, $A$, and a unit vector normal to the area, $\mathbf{\hat{n}}$. The relation is $\mathbf{A} = A \mathbf{\hat{n}}$.

The reason for the dot product is as follows. The only mass flowing through the cross-section is the amount normal to the area, i.e. parallel to the unit normal. This amount is

$$\dot m = \rho v A \cos\theta,$$

where $\theta$ is the angle between the unit normal $\mathbf{\hat{n}}$ and the velocity of mass elements. The amount passing through the cross-section is reduced by the factor $\cos\theta$, as $\theta$ increases less mass passes through. All mass which passes in tangential directions to the area, that is perpendicular to the unit normal, doesn't actually pass through the area, so the mass passing through the area is zero. This occurs when $\theta = \pi /2$:
$$\dot m = \rho v A \cos(\pi/2) = 0.$$
These results are equivalent to the equation containing the dot product. Sometimes these equations are used to define the mass flow rate.

Considering flow through porous media, a special quantity, superficial mass flow rate, can be introduced. It is related with superficial velocity, $v_s$, with the following relationship:
$$\dot m_s = v_s \cdot \rho = \dot m/A$$
The quantity can be used in particle Reynolds number or mass transfer coefficient calculation for fixed and fluidized bed systems.

== Usage ==
In the elementary form of the continuity equation for mass, in hydrodynamics:
$$\rho_1 \mathbf{v}_1 \cdot \mathbf{A}_1 = \rho_2 \mathbf{v}_2 \cdot \mathbf{A}_2.$$

In elementary classical mechanics, mass flow rate is encountered when dealing with objects of variable mass, such as a rocket ejecting spent fuel. Often, descriptions of such objects erroneously invoke Newton's second law $\mathbf{F}=d(m\mathbf{v})/dt$ by treating both the mass $m$ and the velocity $\mathbf{v}$ as time-dependent and then applying the derivative product rule. A correct description of such an object requires the application of Newton's second law to the entire, constant-mass system consisting of both the object and its ejected mass.

Mass flow rate can be used to calculate the energy flow rate of a fluid:
$$\dot{E} = \dot{m}e,$$
where $e$ is the unit mass energy of a system.

Energy flow rate has SI units of kilojoule per second or kilowatt.

== See also ==
- Continuity equation
- Fluid dynamics
- Mass flow controller
- Mass flow meter
- Mass flux
- Orifice plate
- Standard cubic centimetres per minute
- Thermal mass flow meter
- Volumetric flow rate
