= Volumetric flux =

Rate of volume flow across a unit area

In fluid dynamics, the volumetric flux is the rate of volume flow across a unit area. It has dimensions of distance per time (or volume per time-area), equivalent to mean velocity. Its SI unit is m^{3}·s^{−1}·m^{−2} or m·s^{−1}.

The density of a particular property in a fluid's volume, multiplied with the volumetric flux of the fluid, thus defines the advective flux of that property. The volumetric flux through a porous medium is called superficial velocity and it is often modelled using Darcy's law.

Volumetric flux is not to be confused with volumetric flow rate, which is the volume of fluid that passes through a given surface per unit of time (as opposed to a unit surface).
