= Vector area =

Concept in 3-dimensional geometry

In 3-dimensional geometry and vector calculus, an area vector is a vector combining an area quantity with a direction, thus representing an oriented area in three dimensions.

Every bounded surface in three dimensions can be associated with a unique area vector called its vector area. It is equal to the surface integral of the surface normal, and distinct from the usual (scalar) surface area.

Vector area can be seen as the three dimensional generalization of signed area in two dimensions.

== Definition ==
For a finite planar surface of scalar area S and unit normal, the vector area S is defined as the unit normal scaled by the area:
$$\mathbf{S} = \hat \mathbf{n}S$$

For an orientable surface S composed of a set S_{i} of flat facet areas, the vector area of the surface is given by
$$\mathbf{S} = \sum_i \hat \mathbf{n}_i S_i$$
where _{i} is the unit normal vector to the area S_{i}.

For bounded, oriented curved surfaces that are sufficiently well-behaved, we can still define vector area. First, we split the surface into infinitesimal elements, each of which is effectively flat. For each infinitesimal element of area, we have an area vector, also infinitesimal.
$$d\mathbf{S} = \hat \mathbf{n}\ dS$$
where is the local unit vector perpendicular to dS. Integrating gives the vector area for the surface.
$$\mathbf{S} = \int d\mathbf{S}$$

== Properties ==
The vector area of a surface can be interpreted as the (signed) projected area or "shadow" of the surface in the plane in which it is greatest; its direction is given by that plane's normal.

For a curved or faceted (i.e. non-planar) surface, the vector area is smaller in magnitude than the actual surface area. As an extreme example, a closed surface can possess arbitrarily large area, but its vector area is necessarily zero. Surfaces that share a boundary may have very different areas, but they must have the same vector area—the vector area is entirely determined by the boundary. These are consequences of Stokes' theorem.

The vector area of a parallelogram is given by the cross product of the two vectors that span it; it is twice the (vector) area of the triangle formed by the same vectors. In general, the vector area of any surface whose boundary consists of a sequence of straight line segments (analogous to a polygon in two dimensions) can be calculated using a series of cross products corresponding to a triangularization of the surface. This is the generalization of the Shoelace formula to three dimensions.

Using Stokes' theorem applied to an appropriately chosen vector field, a boundary integral for the vector area can be derived:
$$\mathbf{S} = \frac{1}{2} \oint_{\partial S} \mathbf r \times d \mathbf r$$
where ∂S is the boundary of S, i.e. one or more oriented closed space curves. This is analogous to the two dimensional area calculation using Green's theorem.

== Applications ==
Area vectors are used when calculating surface integrals, such as when determining the flux of a vector field through a surface. The flux is given by the integral of the dot product of the field and the (infinitesimal) area vector. When the field is constant over the surface the integral simplifies to the dot product of the field and the vector area of the surface.

=== Projection of area onto planes ===
The projected area onto a plane is given by the dot product of the vector area S and the target plane unit normal:
$$A_{\parallel} = \mathbf{S} \cdot \hat \mathbf{m}$$
For example, the projected area onto the xy-plane is equivalent to the z-component of the vector area, and is also equal to
$$\mathbf{S}_z = \left| \mathbf{S} \right| \cos \theta$$
where θ is the angle between the plane normal and the z-axis.

== See also ==
- Bivector, representing an oriented area in any number of dimensions
- De Gua's theorem, on the decomposition of vector area into orthogonal components
- Cross product
- Surface normal
- Surface integral
