= Volumetric flow rate =

Volume of fluid which passes per unit time

Volume flow rate
- Common symbols: Q, $\dot V$
- SI unit: m^{3}/s
- Dimension: $\mathsf L^{3} \mathsf T^{-1}$

In physics and engineering, in particular fluid dynamics, the volumetric flow rate (also known as volume flow rate, or volume velocity) is the volume of fluid which passes per unit time; usually it is represented by the symbol Q (sometimes $\dot V$). Its SI unit is cubic metres per second (m^{3}/s).

It contrasts with mass flow rate, which is the other main type of fluid flow rate. In most contexts a mention of "rate of fluid flow" is likely to refer to the volumetric rate. In hydrometry, the volumetric flow rate is known as discharge.

The volumetric flow rate across a unit area is called volumetric flux, as defined by Darcy's law and represented by the symbol q. Conversely, the integration of a volumetric flux over a given area gives the volumetric flow rate.

== Units ==
The SI unit is cubic metres per second (m^{3}/s). Another unit used is standard cubic centimetres per minute (SCCM). In US customary units and imperial units, volumetric flow rate is often expressed as cubic feet per second (ft^{3}/s) or gallons per minute (either US or imperial definitions). In oceanography, the sverdrup (symbol: Sv, not to be confused with the sievert) is a non-SI metric unit of flow, with 1 Sv equal to 1 million cubic metres per second (35,000,000 cu ft/s); it is equivalent to the SI derived unit cubic hectometer per second (symbol: hm^{3}/s or hm^{3}⋅s^{−1}). Named after Harald Sverdrup, it is used almost exclusively in oceanography to measure the volumetric rate of transport of ocean currents.

== Fundamental definition ==
Volumetric flow rate is defined by the limit

$$Q = \dot V = \lim\limits_{\Delta t \to 0} \frac{\Delta V}{\Delta t} = \frac{\mathrm d V}{\mathrm d t},$$

that is, the flow of volume of fluid V through a surface per unit time t.

Since this is only the time derivative of volume, a scalar quantity, the volumetric flow rate is also a scalar quantity. The change in volume is the amount that flows after crossing the boundary for some time duration, not simply the initial amount of volume at the boundary minus the final amount at the boundary, since the change in volume flowing through the area would be zero for steady flow.

IUPAC prefers the notation $q_v$ and $q_m$ for volumetric flow and mass flow respectively, to distinguish from the notation $Q$ for heat.

== Alternative definition ==
Volumetric flow rate can also be defined by

$$Q = \mathbf v \cdot \mathbf A,$$

where

v = flow velocity,
A = cross-sectional vector area/surface.

The above equation is only true for uniform or homogeneous flow velocity and a flat or planar cross section. In general, including spatially variable or non-homogeneous flow velocity and curved surfaces, the equation becomes a surface integral:

$$Q = \iint_A \mathbf v \cdot \mathrm d \mathbf A.$$

This is the definition used in practice. The area required to calculate the volumetric flow rate is real or imaginary, flat or curved, either as a cross-sectional area or a surface. The vector area is a combination of the magnitude of the area through which the volume passes through, A, and a unit vector normal to the area, $\hat{\mathbf n}$. The relation is $\mathbf A = A\hat{\mathbf n}$.

=== Derivation ===
The reason for the dot product is as follows. The only volume flowing through the cross-section is the amount normal to the area, that is, parallel to the unit normal. This amount is

$$Q = v A \cos\theta,$$

where θ is the angle between the unit normal $\hat{\mathbf n}$ and the velocity vector v of the substance elements. The amount passing through the cross-section is reduced by the factor cos θ. As θ increases less volume passes through. Substance which passes tangential to the area, that is perpendicular to the unit normal, does not pass through the area. This occurs when θ = π/2 and so this amount of the volumetric flow rate is zero:

$$Q = v A \cos\left(\frac{\pi}{2}\right) = 0.$$

These results are equivalent to the dot product between velocity and the normal direction to the area.

== Relationship with mass flow rate ==
When the mass flow rate is known, and the density can be assumed constant, this is an easy way to get $Q$:

$$Q = \frac{\dot m}{\rho},$$

where

ṁ = mass flow rate (in kg/s),
ρ = density (in kg/m^{3}).

== Related quantities ==
In internal combustion engines, the time area integral is considered over the range of valve opening. The time lift integral is given by

$$\int L \, \mathrm d \theta = \frac{RT}{2 \pi} (\cos\theta_2 - \cos\theta_1) + \frac{rT}{2 \pi} (\theta_2 - \theta_1),$$

where T is the time per revolution, R is the distance from the camshaft centreline to the cam tip, r is the radius of the camshaft (that is, R − r is the maximum lift), θ_{1} is the angle where opening begins, and θ_{2} is where the valve closes (seconds, mm, radians). This has to be factored by the width (circumference) of the valve throat. The answer is usually related to the cylinder's swept volume.

== Some key examples ==
- In cardiac physiology: the cardiac output
- In hydrology: discharge
  - List of rivers by discharge
  - List of waterfalls by flow rate
  - Weir § Flow measurement
- In dust collection systems: the air-to-cloth ratio

== See also ==
- Bulk velocity
- Flow measurement
- Flowmeter
- Mass flow rate
- Orifice plate
- Poiseuille's law
- Stokes flow
