= CC-Link Open Automation Networks =

CC-Link Family of Open Automation Networks
- Governing body: CC-Link Partner Association

Protocol information
- Type of network: Open fieldbus and industrial Ethernet
- Physical media: RS485, optical fiber, Ethernet (gigabit & 100Mbit)
- Network topology: bus, star, ring, line (depending on type)

The CC-Link Open Automation Networks Family are a group of open industrial networks that enable devices from numerous manufacturers to communicate. They are used in a wide variety of industrial automation applications at the machine, cell and line levels.

== History ==
The CC-Link Partner Association (CLPA) offers a family of open-architecture networks. These originated with the CC-Link (Control & Communication) fieldbus in 1996, developed by Mitsubishi Electric Corporation. In 2000, this was released as an “Open” network so that independent automation equipment manufacturers could incorporate CLPA network compatibility into their products. In the same year, the CC-Link Partner Association (CLPA) was formed to manage and oversee the network technology and support manufacturer members. In 2007, the CLPA was the first organisation to introduce open gigabit Ethernet for automation with CC-Link IE (Industrial Ethernet). In 2018, the CLPA was the first organisation to combine open gigabit Ethernet with Time-Sensitive Networking (TSN) as CC-Link IE TSN. As of November 2026, over 3,600 CLPA-compatible products from more than 420 automation manufacturers were available. CLPA offers a variety of open automation network technologies. These are the CC-Link fieldbus, CC-Link Safety fieldbus, CC-Link IE and CC-Link IE TSN. Compatible products include industrial PCs, PLCs, robots, servos, drives, valve manifolds, digital & analogue I/O modules, temperature controllers, mass flow controllers and others. As of November 2026, there were over 47 million compatible devices installed worldwide.

== Structure ==
The CLPA is a global organisation with branches in 6 locations worldwide (Japan, Taiwan, China, South Korea, India and Germany). The headquarters are in Nagoya, Japan. Some branches offer conformance testing facilities (see below). The CLPA is controlled by a board of 8 companies, who are 3M, Analog Devices, Balluff, Cisco, IDEC Corporation, Mitsubishi Electric, NEC and Pro-face. The board controls the strategic direction of the organisation and oversees its operations, including the activities of the technical and marketing task forces and the global branches.

== Industry cooperation ==
The CLPA has been involved in strategic cooperations with other open technology associations in the industrial automation space. These include AutomationML, AVNU, the ODVA, the OPC Foundation and PROFIBUS & PROFINET International (PI). The cooperation with PI resulted in a standard for interoperability between CC-Link IE and PROFINET. The OPC Foundation activity created an OPC UA companion specification for the CLPA's "CSP+ (Control & Communication System Profile) For Machine" technology. Cooperation with AutomationML involved the signing of a Memorandum of Understanding to incorporate the "CSP+" and "CSP+ For Machine" device profile technologies into AutomationML models. Most recently, the CLPA has participated in the TIACC activity along with AVNU, the ODVA, the OPC Foundation and PI to create a single common conformance test plan for the IEC/IEEE 60802 profile of TSN for industrial automation.

== Standardization ==
CLPA has obtained the following certifications for its open network technologies:

- ISO standards: ISO15745-5 (CC-Link, January 2007)
- IEC standards: IEC61158 (CC-Link IE, August 2014), IEC61784 (CC-Link & CC-Link IE, August 2014), IEC61784-3-8 (CC-Link Safety, August 2016)
- SEMI standards: SEMI E54.12 (CC-Link, December 20010, SEMI E54.23-0513 (CC-Link IE Field, May 20130
- Chinese National Standards: GB/Z 19760-2005 (CC-Link, December 2005), GB/T 20229.4-6 (CC-Link, December 2006), GB/Z 19760-2008 (CC-Link, June 2009), GB/Z 29496.1.2.3-2013, GB/T 33537.1~3-2017 (CC-Link IE, April 2017), GB/Z 37085-2018 (CC-Link IE Safety, December 2018)
- Japanese Industrial Standards: JIS TR B0031 (CC-Link Safety, certified May 2013)
- Korean National Standards: KBS ISO 15745-5 (CC-Link, March 2008)
- Taiwan Standard: CNS 15252X6068 (CC-Link, May 2009)

== Conformance testing ==
All certification testing for CLPA networks is carried out by the CLPA and is compulsory in order to ensure that devices manufactured by suppliers meet the strict technical performance standards. These include noise resistance and correct communication functionality.To declare a product as CLPA certified, a vendor needs to successfully test their product at one of the CLPA test laboratories situated in China, Korea, Japan or Germany.
