= Phoenix Contact =

German manufacturer

- Founded: Essen, Germany (1923)
- Founder: Hugo Knümann
- Headquarters: Blomberg, Germany
- Revenue: 2,970,000,000 (2021)
- Number of employees: 20,300
- Website: www.phoenixcontact.com

Phoenix Contact, headquartered in Blomberg, Ostwestfalen-Lippe, Germany, is a manufacturer of industrial automation, interconnection, and interfaces.

The company develops terminal blocks, relays, connectors, signal conditioners, power supplies, controllers & PLCs, I/O systems, Industrial Ethernet, controller system cabling, PCB terminal blocks & connectors, and surge suppression. In addition, Phoenix Contact manufactures products for use with Modbus, DeviceNet, EtherNet/IP, CANopen, PROFIBUS and PROFINET networks.

The company was founded in 1923 in Essen, Germany and in 2021, accounted for annual sales in excess of 2.97 billion Euro (approximately US$3.1 billion). Phoenix Contact manufacturing facilities are located in 10 countries, employing 20,300 employees in 50 international subsidiaries.

== Products ==
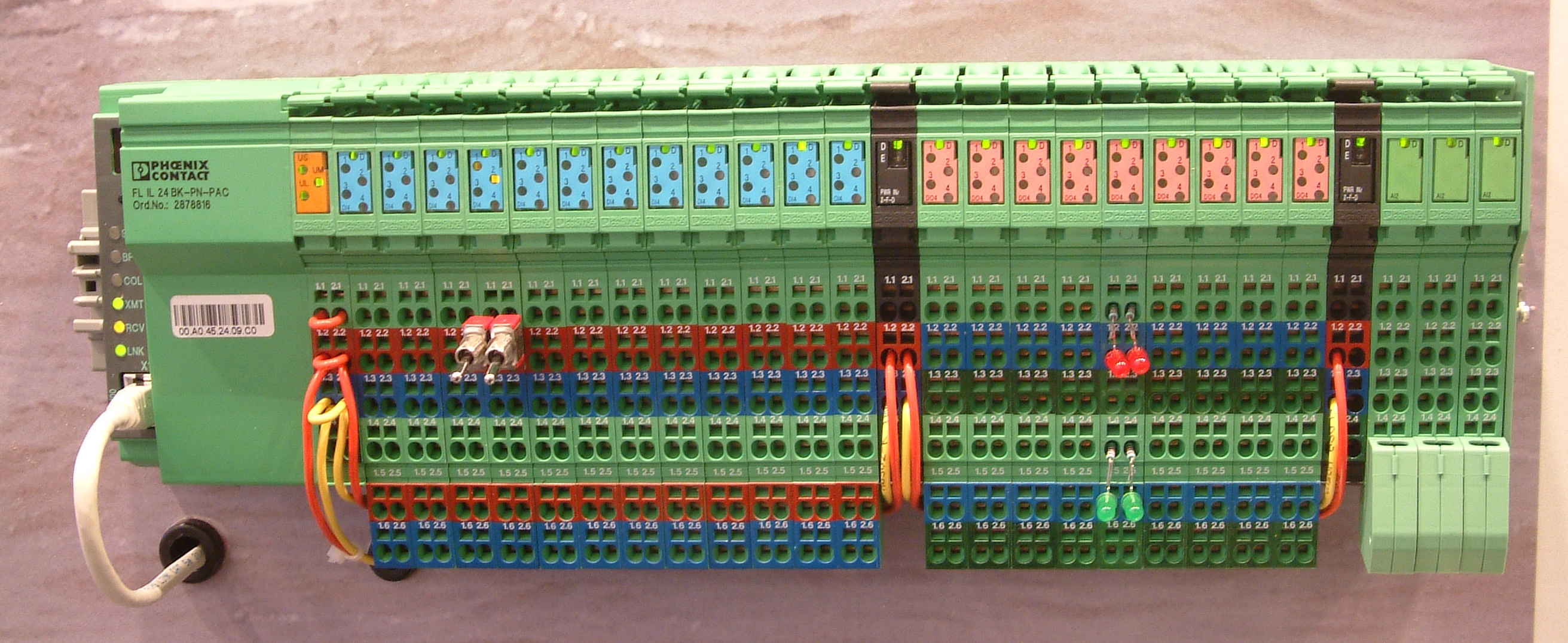
Phoenix Contact Terminal block, Type FL IL 24 BK-PN-PAC

Phoenix Contact is developing and manufacturing circular connectors, sensor cables and terminal blocks mosty for industrial use in control cabinets, in field installations and in device and connection technology. In private households, Phoenix devices are used in control systems for air conditioning, solar, and PV systems. A new market in private households emerged in the 2000s: to the detriment of the owners, complex and expensive home automation systems were often installed in new buildings, which also utilize Phoenix elements.

Competitors include terminal and connector manufacturers Harting, Wago, and Weidmüller.

== History ==
In 1923 Hugo Knümann founded a commercial agency for electrical products and sells contact wire terminals for electric trams in Essen, Germany. Two floors of a rented building in Essen served as the company headquarters: offices were on the first floor; the second story was used for assembly. Soon after, the young company became "Phönix Elektrizitätsgesellschaft" (Phoenix Electricity Company).

Working together with Rhine-Westphalia Electricity Works (RWE), Hugo Knümann developed the first modular terminal block in 1928.

In 1937 Ursula Lampmann, later to become one of the partners, joined the company as the first commercial member of staff. For almost six decades, she had an active role in the company.

On March 13, 1943 the company offices near the Essen train station were destroyed in a British air raid at the Battle of the Ruhr in World War II. The company headquarters moved to the "Bürgerheim" restaurant in Blomberg. 1948 that part of the 30-strong company moved back to Essen.

Hugo Knümann enlisted Josef Eisert, who owned numerous terminal block patents, as technical director for his company in 1949. Eisert revised the entire product range. Following the death of Hugo Knümann in 1953, Josef Eisert and Ursula Lampmann took over the management of Phönix Klemmen. Through a merger, sister company Phoenix Feinbau was created in Lüdenscheid – this marked the birth of the future Phoenix Contact Group.

In 1957 Phoenix opened the first two production facilities at the Flachsmarkt site in Blomberg. Phönix Klemmen employed its first apprentice, Helmut Conrad. In 1961 Klaus Eisert, son of Josef Eisert, joined the company as a managing partner. He remained in this role as of 2018. His brothers Jörg and Gerd join the company in the following year. In Phoenix closed the facility in Essen. At this time more than 300 employees now work at the company's headquarters in Blomberg.

Up from 1981 Phönix Klemmen started establishing subsidiaries in foreign markets. The subsidiary in Switzerland marked the first in 1981. Sweden and the USA followed in the mid-1980s. As of 2018, Phoenix Contact is represented in over 50 countries.

Phönix Klemmen changed its name to the more international Phoenix Contact.

The company developed its sensitive device and systems electronics to be protected against surge voltages in 1983. Phoenix Contact special terminal blocks, Interface, and TRABTECH are innovations from the 1980s.

The Phoenix Contact INTERBUS fieldbus system had a strong impact on automation by offering cross-system openness from the sensor to the controllerand was on the market up from 1987.

The Phoenix Testlab testing institute in Blomberg began its work as Phoenix EMV-Test in 1994. In the same year the company opened a subsidiary in PR China.

1996: High-tech electronics manufactured in-house: a key site was founded in Bad Pyrmont in the form of Phoenix Contact Electronics.

2001: The plant in Bad Pyrmont was expanded to around 10,000 square meters.

2005/2007: A plant covering 12,000 square meters was opened on Thaler Landstraße in 2005. Just two years later, the five story, 15,000 square meter "Innovation Center Electronics" opened, housing the company's Development, Marketing, and Sales departments. The company saw €1.072 billion in revenue worldwide. The number of employees approached 10,000.

2009: Phoenix Contact continued investing and built a 20,000 square meter production hall in Blomberg, representing the company's largest building.

2010: PHOENIX CONTACT Deutschland GmbH was founded. The Phoenix Contact Germany sales subsidiary was established, with over 300 employees in the field and in the sales offices.

2012: The company organized into three segments: Device and PCB connection technology, Industrial components for electrical engineering and electronics, and Industry-specific automation solutions.

2015: Frank Stührenberg has been the managing director, who started out as an assistant to the management at Phoenix in 1992; he is also a board member of ZVEI.

2018: Phoenix Contact had continuously increased the number of employees to over 17,000.

== Worldwide locations ==
US headquarters:

- Phoenix Contact USA, one of the company's first international subsidiaries, was established in 1981 in Middletown, Pennsylvania.

Southeast Asia headquarters:

- Phoenix Contact SEA was established in 1998, with its office in Singapore, overseeing offices in Malaysia, Thailand, Vietnam, Indonesia, Philippines and Myanmar.

Production sites:

- Germany: Blomberg, Bad Pyrmont, Lüdenscheid, Herrenberg, Filderstadt.
- Other: Harrisburg (USA), Nanjing (China), New Delhi (India), Nowy Tomysl (Poland), Vasiliko (Greece), São Paulo (Brazil), Bursa (Turkey), Älvdalen (Sweden), Buenos Aires (Argentina), Saudi Arabia

== See also ==
- EtherNet/IP
- Industrial Ethernet
- INTERBUS
