= Varan (disambiguation) =

Varan a giant monster from the 1958 Japanese film Varan the Unbelievable.

Varan may also refer to:

- Varan, Iran, village in Iran
- Esin Varan, American actress
- VARAN, an industrial communication system
- Varanus, a genus of lizards
- Ateliers Varan, association of filmmakers based in Paris, named after the lizard
- Varan (novel), fantasy novel by Ukrainian writers Maryna and Serhiy Dyachenko
- Varan (camouflage), Ukrainian camouflage pattern

== See also ==
- Varan-TV, Swedish TV-series
