= PROFIenergy =

PROFIenergy is a profile of the PROFINET communications protocol that allows the power consumption of automation equipment in manufacturing (such as robot assembly cells, laser cutters and sub-systems such as paint lines) to be managed over a PROFINET network. It controls energy usage during planned and unplanned breaks in production. No external hard-wired systems are required. The technology standard is managed by the industry association Profibus and Profinet International.

== Background ==
The idea for a standardized energy efficiency profile came from Juergen Kuebler an employee of Mercedes-Benz and was motivated by the AIDA group of automotive manufacturers in Germany. AIDA companies comprise Audi, BMW, Mercedes-Benz, Porsche and VW. A PI Working Group set up to develop the new profile is about to publish the specification. The PI Working Group comprises ABB, AIT, Bosch, Danfoss, Hilscher, ifak, Lenze, Murr Elektronik, Phoenix Contact, SEW Eurodrive, SCA Schucker, Rexroth, Siemens, KUKA and WZL.

PROFIenergy relies on three production elements working together: the controlling device in an automation network (usually a PLC, but it could be a supervisory system or dedicated energy management controller on the same network), the communications network (PROFINET), and the power consuming unit (which could be a single device or item of equipment, a cell or even a larger sub-system).

The PROFIenergy switching mechanisms reside inside energy consumers. No additional hard-wiring is required. The controlling device transmits signals via PROFINET to say when production pauses will happen. These can be at known times, or in response to random conditions e.g. breakdowns. Each unit then decides how this information is to be handled.

Equipment vendors implement an energy management strategy by embedding a software ‘agent’ in the equipment firmware. This responds to the PROFIenergy commands in ways that suit the equipment. For example, a production cell may need a conveyor to be slowed down before a robot can be put into ‘sleep’ mode. If the duration of a pause is long enough, perhaps the ECU can be completely disconnected. To be ready to restart on demand, its conveyor must be restarted in advance. Multi-level ‘sleep modes’ are also feasible.

PROFIenergy can transmit power demand information back to the controller to support more sophisticated energy savings schemes, including peak load management. Other, non-electrical, energy-consuming equipment could also be managed.

== Use cases ==
PROFINET uses the acyclic slots of the PROFINET communications protocol and does not interfere with co-existing automation processes. The commands are based on the following use cases:

Brief pauses (say up to one hour) - In general, such pauses are planned - e.g. lunchtime breaks – enabling devices to be routinely switched off. Safety-related functions are protected. On restart, the system restarts devices in a switch-on sequence and checks that they all have started up correctly. The production process is then restarted.

Longer pauses (typically hours or days) – These are similar to the above but additional devices can be put into standby or switched off completely, or deeper ‘sleep’ modes can be initiated.

Unscheduled pauses (typically breakdowns) – These are also similar, but the user does not know when they will happen or the duration. Initially, devices are put into a ‘stop’ condition to reduce energy consumption. Depending on duration, equipment can be switched into further energy-saving states if required.

Measuring and visualization of the load – Data is collected from the equipment, either directly (by instrumentation) or implicitly (by knowing the electrical parameters). Knowing when, where and how much energy is required could lead to more effective energy strategies. The energy consumption of a machine can also be visualized and archived on an HMI. This means that semi-automatic (i.e. partially manual) responses are possible too. It also means that other energy intensive processes such as pneumatics, steam or hydraulic systems could also be managed over the network.
