= INTERBUS =

INTERBUS is a serial bus system which transmits data between control systems (e.g., PCs, PLCs, VMEbus computers, robot controllers etc.) and spatially distributed I/O modules that are connected to sensors and actuators (e.g., temperature sensors, position switches).

The INTERBUS system was developed by Phoenix Contact and has been available since 1987. It is one of the leading Fieldbus systems in the automation industry and is fully standardized according to European Standard EN 50254 and IEC 61158.

At the moment, more than 600 manufacturers are involved in the implementation of INTERBUS technology in control systems and field devices.

Since 2011 the INTERBUS technology is hosted by the industry association Profibus and Profinet International.

== See also ==
- BiSS interface
