= NAMUR =

International association for users of automation technology and digitalization

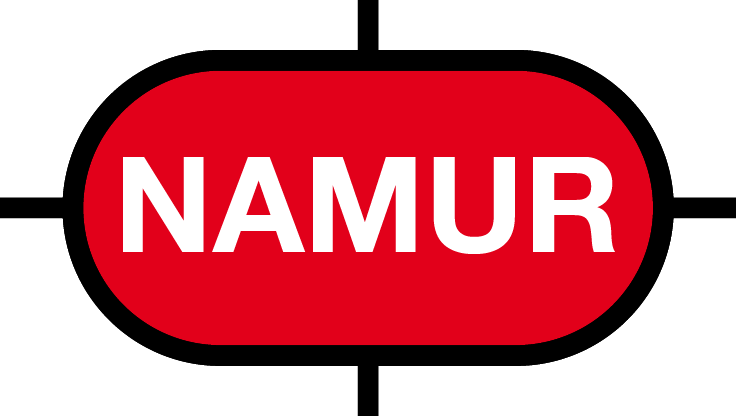
- Formation: November 3rd, 1949
- Location: Leverkusen, Germany
- Members: 166 member companies
- President: Dr. Felix Hanisch
- Website: http://www.namur.net/en/index.html

User Association of Automation Technology in Process Industries (NAMUR) (German: Interessengemeinschaft Automatisierungstechnik der Prozessindustrie), established in 1949, is an international association for users of automation technology and digitalization in the process industries with its headquarters in Leverkusen, Germany. The association represents the interests of, and supports the experience exchange among over 160 member companies and with other associations and organizations. Work results are published in the form of NAMUR recommendations and worksheets and submitted to national and international standardization bodies as proposed standards.

== History ==
NAMUR was established on 3 November 1949 in Leverkusen. The founders were renowned experts in the chemical industry working for Bayer, BASF, Hüls and others. Established as the Association for Standardization of Measurement and Control Engineering in the Chemical Industry, the original full name of the association was the "Normenarbeitsgemeinschaft für Mess- und Regeltechnik in der chemischen Industrie", hence the acronym NAMUR. However, the original full name is no longer used today. Among others, involvement took place in the development of standards related to the 4–20 mA current loop, NAMUR sensors (e.g., IEC 60947-5-6]), NAMUR solenoid mounting plates (VDI/VDE 3845, ISO 5211), and Profibus. The exchange of experience about the equipment used in the member companies has been an important aspect of the association's activities from the very beginning.

Membership in NAMUR was originally restricted to companies in the chemical, pharmaceutical and petrochemical industries. In 2003, membership was extended to all companies in the process industries including engineering companies, service providers and legal entities which are mainly active in the technical and scientific scope of NAMUR. However, equipment supplier companies are not allowed to be a member of NAMUR in order to avoid conflicts of interest. NAMUR grants company membership, only. A personal membership is not possible.

== Goals ==
NAMUR contributes to the value generation of its member companies leading to efficient (costs, availability), sustainable and reliable processes.

NAMUR strives for:

- Reliable processes thanks to automation competence
- Cost savings by the use of synergy effects
- Definition of requirements
- Active influencing of regulations
- Focusing on the future
- Securing up-and-coming engineering talent

== Organization ==
NAMUR has more than 160 member companies from 10 countries.

The association's executive bodies are the Annual General Meeting, the Board of Management and the NAMUR Office.

Technical work within NAMUR is conducted in almost 40 working groups. The working groups draft and maintain NAMUR recommendations and worksheets and express NAMUR's opinion on current issues within the automation engineering community. Working groups are organized in four work areas

- Work area 1 "Project Planning and Construction"
- Work area 2 "Automation Systems for Processes and Plants
- Work area 3 "Electrical and Instrumentation Technology
- Work area 4 "Operation support and maintenance".

Activities in China, initiated by 2008, led to the foundation of local working groups with focus on regionally specific topics. They are coordinated by the a Chinese NAMUR office.

NAMUR has a broad international network in the European and American regions. There are various cooperation agreements with associations at national and international level.

NAMUR organizes an annual General Meeting for its member companies and invited guests with approximately 650 participants. In the course of the event, NAMUR awards are also granted for outstanding final theses in the field of automation technology and digitization in the process industry.

== NAMUR recommendations and worksheets ==
The most important element in the publication of NAMUR's work are NAMUR recommendations (NE) and worksheets (NA).They describe procedures, provide supporting material like check lists and define requirements related to equipment and systems. These documents should not be regarded as standards or guidelines, but rather describe the current state-of-the-art technology. They serve as a basis for discussions with equipment manufacturers and influence international standardization activities. NAMUR recommendations and worksheets are used by many companies around the world and they are available in German, English and partially in Chinese language.

- NAMUR Recommendations (NE) provide an explanation of the state of the art and regulations for member companies as well as for manufacturers, scientists and authorities.
- NAMUR worksheets (NA) are an aid in the form of checklists and instructions for practical work in companies.

Currently, more than 100 NAMUR recommendations and worksheets are available.
