= VARAN =

VARAN (Versatile Automation Random Access Network) is a Ethernet-based Fieldbus industrial communication system.

VARAN is a wired data network technology for local data networks (LAN) with the main application in the field of automation technology. It enables the exchange of data in the form of data frames between all LAN connected devices (controllers, input/output devices, drives, etc.). VARAN includes the definitions for types of cables and connectors, describes the physical signalling and specifies packet formats and protocols. From the perspective of the OSI model, VARAN specifies both the physical layer (OSI Layer 1) and the data link layer (OSI Layer 2). VARAN is a protocol according to the principle master-slave. The VARAN BUS USER ORGANIZATION (VNO) is responsible for the care of the Protocol.
