= RAPIEnet =

RAPIEnet
Protocol Information
| Type of Network | Open Real-time Ethernet |
| Physical Layer | IEEE 802.3, Ethertype 0x88fe |
| Network Topology | Ring or Line topology |
| Device Addressing | DIP switch or hardware/software |
| Network Configuration | Automatically done by protocol |

RAPIEnet (Real-time Automation Protocols for Industrial Ethernet) was Korea's first Ethernet international standard for real-time data transmission. It is an Ethernet-based industrial networking protocol, developed in-house by LSIS offers real-time transmission and is registered as an international standard. (IEC 61158-3-21: 2010, IEC 61158-4-21: 2010, IEC 61158-5-21: 2010, IEC 61158-6-21: 2010, IEC 61784-2: 2010, IEC 62439-7)

== Features ==
- An embedded Ethernet switch with two ports enables the network expansion in a daisy chain without the need for an additional external switch, easy installation and wiring reduction.
- 100 Mbit/s - 1 Gbit/s transmission speed, allowing electrical and optical media to be used together.
- Supports transmission modes such as Unicast, Multicast, and Broadcast.
- Supports "Store & Forward”and “Cut Through” switching.

== RAPIEnet Technology ==
=== Protocol Stack Structure ===
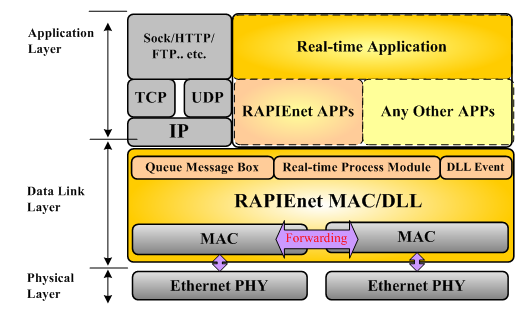
Figure 1. RAPIEnet Protocol Stack Structure

=== Embedded dual port switch motion ===
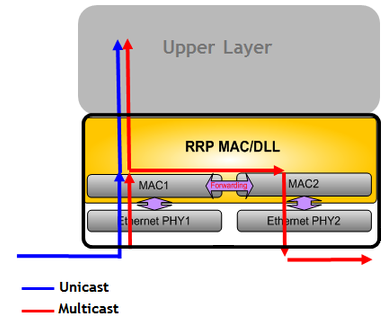
Figure 2. RAPIEnet Embedded dual port switch motion

- An embedded hardware-based switch is adopted for real-time data transmission.
- With the full-duplex communication support, each node has dual link routes in a ring topology.

=== Frame Format ===
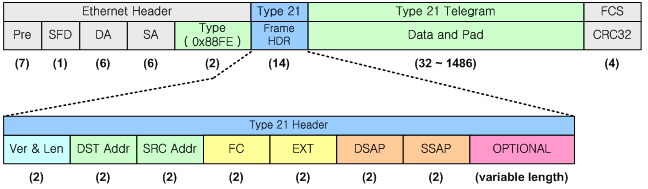
Figure 3. ISO/IEC 8802.3 RAPIEnet based RAPIEnet frame format

- RAPIEnet Ether type: 0x88FE

=== Topology ===
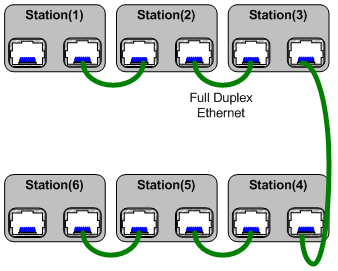
Figure 4. RAPIEnet chain topology

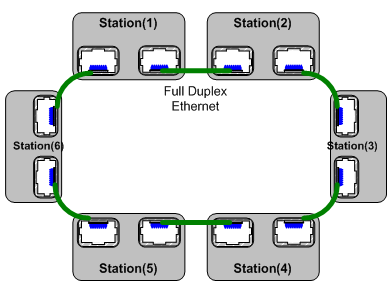
Figure 5. RAPIEnet ring topology

=== Recovery System ===
- With an embedded switch and full-duplex, it has dual link routes and communication fault tolerance, enabling fast recovery capabilities.

- Recovery time < 10 ms

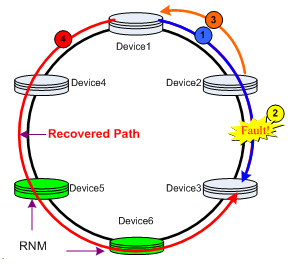
Figure 6. RAPIEnet recovery system in a ring topology

1. Transmits signal from Device 1 to Device 3.
2. A fault occurs between Device 2 and Device 3.
3. Notify the fault from Device 2 to Device 1.
4. Transmits signal back from Device 1 to Device 3.

=== Flexible Hybrid Structure ===
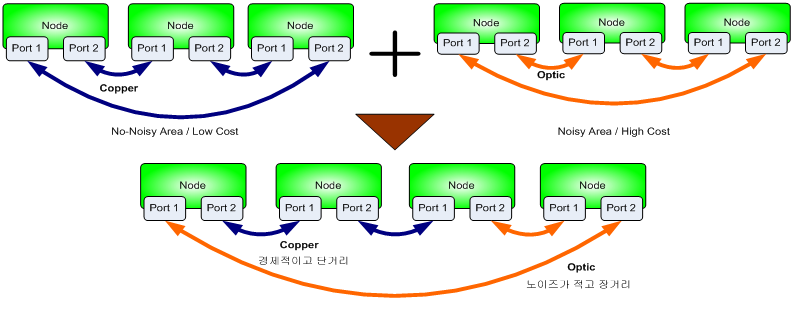
Figure 7. RAPIEnet Flexible Hybrid Structure

- Fiber Optics/Copper Media

- Copper: Low installation costs with relatively big noise.
- Optics: High installation costs with low noise and relatively long wiring.

- Simple and efficient wiring is available by combining the features of two wires that have advantages and disadvantages.

== System Diagram Using RAPIEnet ==
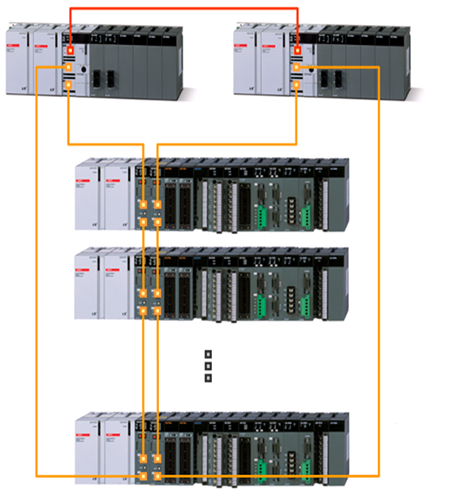
Figure 8. System diagram using RAPIEnet

== Acquired Standards ==
=== International Standards ===
- IEC 61158-3-21: 2010, Industrial communication networks - Fieldbus specifications - Part 3-21: Data-link layer service definition - Type 21 elements.
- IEC 61158-4-21: 2010, Industrial communication networks - Fieldbus specifications - Part 4-21: Data-link layer protocol specification - Type 21 elements.
- IEC 61158-5-21: 2010, Industrial communication networks - Fieldbus specifications - Part 5-21: Application layer service definition - Type 21 elements.
- IEC 61158-6-21: 2010, Industrial communication networks - Fieldbus specifications - Part 6-21: Application layer protocol specification - Type 21 elements.
- IEC 61784-2: 2010, Industrial communication networks - Profiles - Part 2: Additional fieldbus profiles for real-time networks based on ISO/IEC 8802-3.
- IEC 62439-7, Industrial communication networks - High availability automation networks - Part 7: Ring-based Redundancy Protocol (RRP)

== Others ==
=== Other international standards in process ===
- IEC 61784-5-17, Industrial communication networks - Profiles - Part 5-17: Installation of fieldbuses - Installation profiles for CPF 17 (to be registered as an IEC international standard in 2012)
