= RS-485 =

Multidrop serial communication standard

TIA-485-A (Revision of EIA-485)
- Standard: ANSI/TIA/EIA-485-A-1998; Approved: March 3, 1998; Reaffirmed: December 7, 2012

Protocol information
- Physical media: Balanced interconnecting cable
- Network topology: Point-to-point, multi-dropped, multi-point
- Maximum devices: At least 32 unit loads
- Maximum distance: Not specified
- Mode of operation: Different receiver levels: binary 1 (OFF) (Voa–Vob < −200 mV) binary 0 (ON) (Voa–Vob > +200 mV)
- Available signals: A, B, C
- Connector types: Not specified

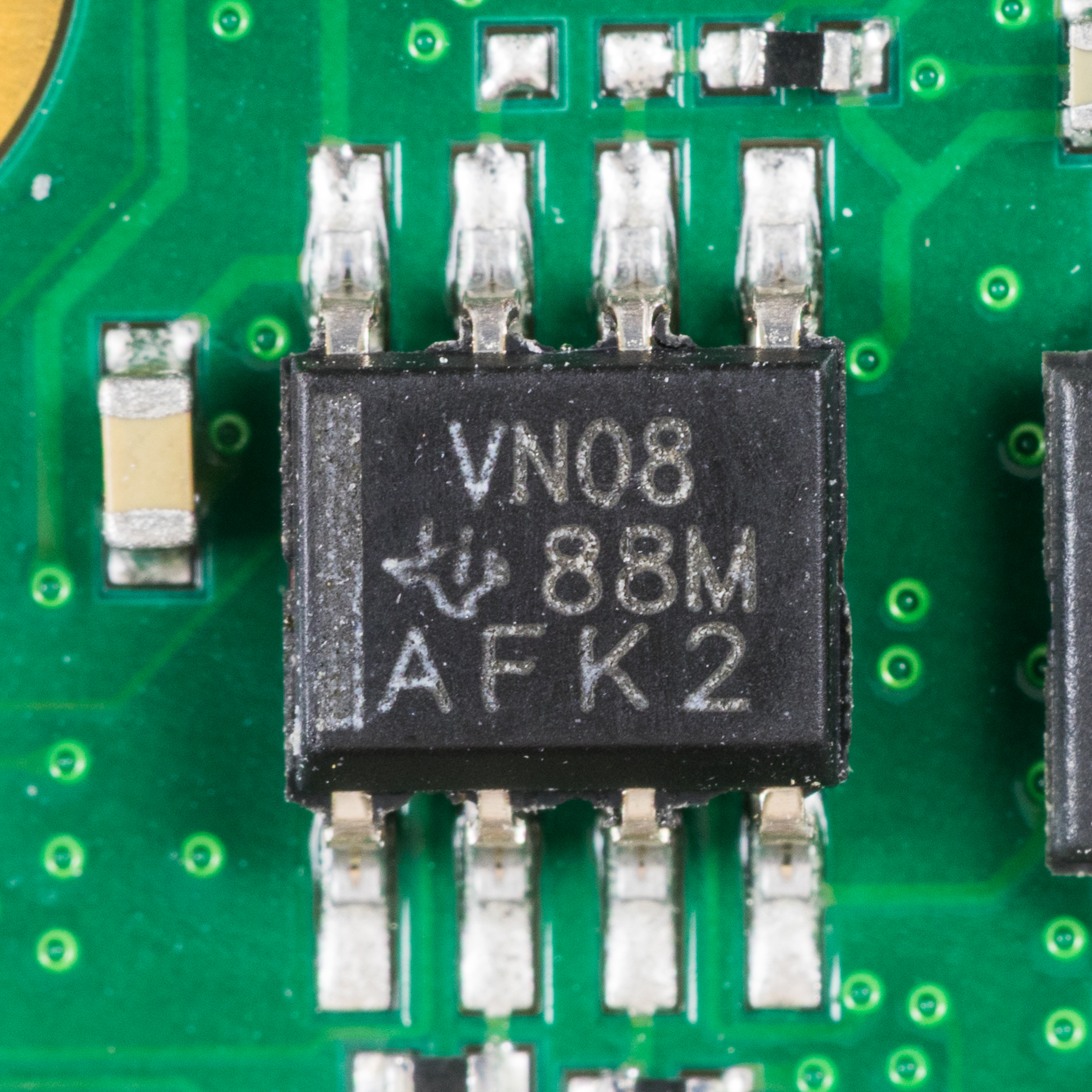
Texas Instruments VN08 (SN75HVD08) - wide supply range RS-485 transceiver

RS-485, also known as TIA-485(-A) or EIA-485, is a standard, originally introduced in 1983, defining the electrical characteristics of drivers and receivers for use in serial communications systems. Electrical signaling is balanced, and multipoint systems are supported. The standard is jointly published by the Telecommunications Industry Association and Electronic Industries Alliance (TIA/EIA). Digital communications networks implementing the standard can be used effectively over long distances and in electrically noisy environments. Multiple receivers may be connected to such a network in a linear, multidrop bus. These characteristics make RS-485 useful in industrial control systems and similar applications.

== Overview ==
RS-485 supports inexpensive local networks and multidrop communications links, using the same differential signaling over twisted pair as RS-422. It is generally accepted that RS-485 can be used with data rates up to 10 Mbit/s (Note: Under some conditions it can be used up to data transmission speeds of 64 Mbit/s.) or, at lower speeds, distances up to 1,200 m (4,000 ft). As a rule of thumb, the speed in bit/s multiplied by the length in meters should not exceed 10^{8}. Thus a 50-meter cable should not signal faster than 2 Mbit/s.

In contrast to RS-422, which has a driver circuit that cannot be switched off, RS-485 drivers use three-state logic, allowing individual transmitters to be deactivated. This allows RS-485 to implement linear bus topologies using only two wires. The equipment located along a set of RS-485 wires is interchangeably called nodes, stations or devices. The recommended arrangement of the wires is as a connected series of point-to-point (multidropped) nodes, i.e. a line or bus, not a star, ring, or multiply connected network. Star and ring topologies are not recommended because of signal reflections or excessively low or high termination impedance. If a star configuration is unavoidable, special RS-485 repeaters are available which bidirectionally listen for data on each span and then retransmit the data onto all other spans.

Typical bias network together with termination. Biasing and termination values are not specified in the RS-485 standard. However, bias resistors are no longer commonly recommended by component suppliers.

Ideally, the two ends of the cable will have a termination resistor connected across the two wires. Without termination resistors, signal reflections off the unterminated end of the cable can cause data corruption. Termination resistors also reduce electrical noise sensitivity due to the lower impedance. The value of each termination resistor should be equal to the cable characteristic impedance (typically, 120 ohms for twisted pairs). The termination also includes pull-up and pull-down resistors to establish bias for each data wire for the case when the lines are not being driven by any device. This way, the lines will be biased to known voltages and nodes will not interpret the noise from undriven lines as actual data; without biasing resistors, the data lines float in such a way that electrical noise sensitivity is greatest when all device stations are silent or unpowered.

== Standard ==
The EIA once labeled all its standards with the prefix RS (recommended standard), but the EIA/TIA officially replaced RS with EIA/TIA to help identify the origin of its standards. The EIA has officially disbanded and the standard is now maintained by the TIA as TIA-485, but engineers and applications guides continue to use the RS-485 designation. The initial edition of EIA RS-485 was dated April 1983.

RS-485 only specifies the electrical characteristics of the generator and the receiver: the physical layer. It does not specify or recommend any communications protocol; Other standards define the protocols for communication over an RS-485 link. The foreword to the standard references The Telecommunications Systems Bulletin TSB-89 which contains application guidelines, including data signaling rate vs. cable length, stub length, and configurations.

Section 4 defines the electrical characteristics of the generator (transmitter or driver), receiver, transceiver, and system. These characteristics include: definition of a unit load, voltage ranges, open-circuit voltages, thresholds, and transient tolerance. It also defines three generator interface points (signal lines); A, B and C. The data are transmitted on A and B. C is a ground reference. This section also defines the logic states 1 (off) and 0 (on), by the polarity between A and B terminals. If A is negative with respect to B, the state is binary 1. The reversed polarity (A positive with respect to B) is binary 0. The standard does not assign any logic function to the two states.

== Full duplex operation ==
RS-485, like RS-422, can be made full-duplex by using four wires. Since RS-485 is a multi-point specification, however, this is not necessary or desirable in many cases. RS-485 and RS-422 can interoperate with certain restrictions.

== Converters and repeaters ==
Converters between RS-485 and RS-232 are available to allow a personal computer to communicate with remote devices. By using repeaters very large RS-485 networks can be formed.

== Network topology ==
TSB-89A, Application Guidelines for TIA/EIA-485-A does not recommend using star topology, as doing so may lead to long stubs (branches of the star), which can cause signal reflections that make data transmission unreliable.

== Protocols ==
RS-485 does not define a communication protocol; merely an electrical interface. Although many applications use RS-485 signal levels, the speed, format, and protocol of the data transmission are not specified by RS-485. Interoperability of even similar devices from different manufacturers is not assured by compliance with the signal levels alone.

== Applications ==
RS-485 signals are used in a wide range of computer and automation systems.

In a computer system, SCSI-2 and SCSI-3 may use RS-485 to implement the physical layer for data transmission between a controller and a disk drive.

RS-485 is used for low-speed data communications in commercial aircraft cabins' vehicle bus. It requires minimal wiring and can share the wiring among several seats, reducing weight.

These are used in programmable logic controllers and on factory floors. RS-485 is used as the physical layer underlying many standard and proprietary automation protocols used to implement industrial control systems, including the most common versions of Modbus and Profibus. DH 485 is a proprietary communications protocol used by Allen-Bradley in their line of industrial control units. Utilizing a series of dedicated interface devices, it allows PCs and industrial controllers to communicate. Since it is differential, it resists electromagnetic interference from motors and welding equipment.

In theatre and performance venues, RS-485 networks are used to control lighting and other systems using the DMX512 protocol. RS-485 serves as a physical layer for the AES3 digital audio interconnect.

RS-485 is also used in building automation as the simple bus wiring and long cable length is ideal for joining remote devices. It may be used to control video surveillance systems or to interconnect security control panels and devices such as access control card readers.

It is also used in Digital Command Control (DCC) for model railways. The external interface to the DCC command station is often RS-485 used by hand-held controllers or for controlling the layout in a networked PC environment. 8P8C modular connectors are used in this case.

== Signals ==
RS-485 interface consisting of a line driver and line receiver. Single-ended signals are shown on the left. The RS-485 bus, shown on the right, has three signals consisting of a differential pair and signal common.

RS-485 signal states
Signal	Mark (logic 1)	Space (logic 0)
A	Low	High
B	High	Low

The RS-485 differential line consists of two signals:

- A, which is low for logic 1 and high for logic 0 and,
- B, which is high for logic 1 and low for logic 0.

Because a mark (logic 1) condition is traditionally represented (e.g. in RS-232) with a negative voltage, and space (logic 0) is represented with a positive one, A may be considered the non-inverting signal and B as inverting. The RS-485 standard states (paraphrased):

- For an off, mark or logic 1 state, the driver's A terminal is negative relative to the B terminal.
- For an on, space or logic 0 state, the driver's A terminal is positive relative to the B terminal. (Note: There is an apparent typo in this statement as both states in the standard are designated binary 1. It is clear in the figure that follows that the off state corresponds to binary 1 and on corresponds to binary 0.)

The truth tables of most popular devices, starting with the SN75176, show the output signals inverted. This is in accordance with the A/B naming used by most differential transceiver manufacturers, including:

- Intersil, as seen in their data sheet for the ISL4489 transceiver
- Maxim, as seen in their data sheet for the MAX483 transceiver and for the new generation 3.3v micro controller the MAX3485
- Linear Technology, as seen in their datasheet for the LTC2850, LTC2851, LTC2852
- Analog Devices, as seen in their datasheet for the ADM3483, ADM3485, ADM3488, ADM3490, ADM3491
- FTDI, as seen in their datasheet for the USB-RS485-WE-1800-BT

These manufacturers all agree on the meaning of the standard, and their practice is in widespread use. The issue also exists in programmable logic controller applications. (Note: With Modbus, BACnet and Profibus, A/B labeling refers A as the negative green wire and B as the positive red wire, in the definition of the D-sub connector and M12 circular connector, as can be seen in Profibus guides. As long as standard excludes logic function of the generator or receiver, it would make sense A (green, negative) is higher than B (red, positive). However this contradicts the facts that an idle mark state is a logical one and the termination polarization puts B at a higher voltage in Profibus guidelines. That so-called 'Pesky Polarity' problem raised confusion which made authors think A is inverting within the TIA-485-A standard itself and advise to swap what is A and B in drivers and line labeling as can be read in a section of an application bulletin: "Design Consideration #3: Sometimes Bus Node A Isn’t Really Bus Node A". It is now a common design decision to make this inversion which involves the following polarity chain: UART/MCU idle → TTL/CMOS = +5 V → Line B voltage > Line A voltage, implying A, the green wire, is indeed connected to the driver inverting signal, as seen in a whitepaper.) Care must be taken when using A/B naming. Alternate nomenclature is often used to avoid confusion surrounding the A/B naming:

- TX+/RX+ or D+ as alternative for B (high for mark i.e. idle)
- TX−/RX− or D− as alternative for A (low for mark i.e. idle)

RS-485 standard-conformant drivers provide a differential output of a minimum 1.5 V across a 54-Ω load, whereas standard-conformant receivers detect a differential input down to 200 mV. The two values provide a sufficient margin for reliable data transmission even under severe signal degradation across the cable and connectors. This robustness is the main reason why RS-485 is well suited for long-distance networking in noisy environment.

In addition to the A and B connections, an optional, third connection may be present (the TIA standard requires the presence of a common return path between all circuit grounds along the balanced line for proper operation) called SC, G or reference, the common signal reference ground used by the receiver to measure the A and B voltages. This connection may be used to limit the common-mode signal that can be impressed on the receiver inputs. The allowable common-mode voltage is in the range −7 V to +12 V, i.e., ±7 V on top of the 0–5 V signal range. Failure to stay within this range will result in, at best, signal corruption, and, at worst, damage to connected devices.

Care must be taken that an SC connection, especially over long cable runs, does not result in an attempt to connect disparate grounds together – it is wise to add some current limiting to the SC connection. Grounds between buildings may vary by a small voltage, but with very low impedance and hence the possibility of catastrophic currents – enough to melt signal cables, PCB traces, and transceiver devices.

RS-485 does not specify any connector or pinout. Circuits may be terminated on screw terminals, D-subminiature connectors, or other types of connectors.

The standard does not discuss cable shielding but makes some recommendations on preferred methods of interconnecting the signal reference common and equipment case grounds.

== Waveform example ==
The diagram below shows potentials of the A (blue) and B (red) pins of an RS-485 line before, during, and after transmission of one byte (0xD3, least significant bit first) of data using an asynchronous start-stop method.

B (U+, inverting) signal shown in red, A (U−, non-inverting) signal shown in blue

== See also ==
- List of network buses
