= Bus network =

Computer network topology

Topology of a bus network

A bus network is a network topology in which nodes are directly connected to a common half-duplex link called a bus.

A conceptual diagram of a local area network using bus topology

A host on a bus network is called a station. In a bus network, every station will receive all network traffic, and the traffic generated by each station has equal transmission priority. A bus network forms a single network segment and collision domain. In order for nodes to share the bus, they use a medium access control technology such as carrier-sense multiple access (CSMA) or a bus master.
