= List of automation protocols =

This is a list of communication protocols used for the automation of processes (industrial or otherwise), such as for building automation, power-system automation, automatic meter reading, and vehicular automation.

== Process automation protocols ==
- AS-i – Actuator-sensor interface, a low level 2-wire bus establishing power and communications to basic digital and analog devices
- BSAP – Bristol Standard Asynchronous Protocol, developed by Bristol Babcock Inc.
- CC-Link Industrial Networks – Supported by the CLPA
- CIP (Common Industrial Protocol) – can be treated as application layer common to DeviceNet, CompoNet, ControlNet and EtherNet/IP
- ControlNet – an implementation of CIP, originally by Allen-Bradley
- DeviceNet – an implementation of CIP, originally by Allen-Bradley
- DF-1 - used by Allen-Bradley ControlLogix, CompactLogix, PLC-5, SLC-500, and MicroLogix class devices
- DNP3 - a protocol used to communicate by industrial control and utility SCADA systems
- DirectNet – Koyo / Automation Direct proprietary, yet documented PLC interface
- EtherCAT
- Ethernet Global Data (EGD) – GE Fanuc PLCs (see also SRTP)
- EtherNet/IP – IP stands for "Industrial Protocol". An implementation of CIP, originally created by Rockwell Automation
- Ethernet Powerlink – an open protocol managed by the Ethernet POWERLINK Standardization Group (EPSG).
- FINS, Omron's protocol for communication over several networks, including Ethernet.
- FOUNDATION fieldbus – H1 & HSE
- HART Protocol
- HostLink Protocol, Omron's protocol for communication over serial links.
- Interbus, Phoenix Contact's protocol for communication over serial links, now part of PROFINET IO
- MECHATROLINK – open protocol originally developed by Yaskawa, supported by the MMA
- MelsecNet, and MelsecNet II, /B, and /H, supported by Mitsubishi Electric.
- Modbus PEMEX
- Modbus Plus
- Modbus RTU or ASCII or TCP
- MPI – Multi Point Interface
- OSGP – The Open Smart Grid Protocol, a widely use protocol for smart grid devices built on ISO/IEC 14908.1
- OpenADR – Open Automated Demand Response; protocol to manage electricity consuming/controlling devices
- Optomux – Serial (RS-422/485) network protocol originally developed by Opto 22 in 1982. The protocol was openly documented and over time used for industrial automation applications.
- Process Image Exchange Protocol (PieP) – An Open Fieldbus Protocol
- Profibus – by PROFIBUS & PROFINET International (PI)
- PROFINET - by PROFIBUS & PROFINET International (PI)
- RAPIEnet – Real-time Automation Protocols for Industrial Ethernet
- Honeywell SDS – Smart Distributed System – Originally developed by Honeywell. Currently supported by Holjeron.
- SERCOS III, Ethernet-based version of SERCOS real-time interface standard
- SERCOS interface, Open Protocol for hard real-time control of motion and I/O
- GE SRTP – GE Fanuc PLCs
- Sinec H1 – Siemens
- SynqNet – Danaher
- TTEthernet – TTTech

== Industrial control system protocols ==
- Data Distribution Service from the Object Management Group
- EPICS Channel Access and PV Access (PVA), particle accelerator control system framework
- MTConnect
- OPC Unified Architecture
- Open Platform Communications, formerly OLE for process control

== Building automation protocols ==
- 1-Wire – from Dallas/Maxim
- BACnet – for Building Automation and Control networks, maintained by ASHRAE Committee SSPC 135.
- BatiBUS - merged to KNX
- C-Bus Clipsal Integrated Systems Main Proprietary Protocol
- CC-Link Industrial Networks, supported by Mitsubishi Electric
- DALI - Digital Addressable Lighting Interface specified in IEC 62386.
- DSI - Digital Serial Interface for the controlling of lighting in building, precursor to DALI.
- Dynet - lighting and automation control protocol developed in Sydney, Australia by the company Dynalite
- EnOcean – Low Power Wireless protocol for energy harvesting and very lower power devices.
- European Home Systems Protocol (EHS) - merged to KNX
- European Installation Bus (EIB) named also Instabus - merged to KNX
- INSTEON - SmartHome Labs Pro New 2-way Protocol based on Power-BUS.
- KNX – Standard for building control. Previously Batibus/EHS/EIB
- LonTalk – protocol for LonWorks technology by Echelon Corporation
- Modbus RTU or ASCII or TCP
- oBIX - Open Building Information Exchange is a standard for RESTful Web Services-based interfaces to building control systems developed by OASIS.
- UPB - 2-way Peer to Peer Protocol
- VSCP - Very Simple Control Protocol is a free protocol with main focus on building- or home-automation
- xAP – Open protocol
- X10 – Open standard for communication among electronic devices used for home automation (domotics)
- Z-Wave - Wireless RF Protocol
- Zigbee – Open protocol for Mesh Networks

== Power system automation protocols ==
- DNP3 – Distributed Network Protocol
- IEC 60870-5
- IEC 61850
- IEC 62351 – Security for IEC 60870, 61850, DNP3 & ICCP protocols

== Automatic meter reading protocols ==
- ANSI C12.18
- DLMS/IEC 62056
- IEC 61107
- M-Bus
- OMS
- Zigbee Smart Energy 2.0
- Modbus
- ANSI C12.21
- ANSI C12.22

== Automobile / Vehicle protocol buses ==
- Controller Area Network (CAN) – an inexpensive low-speed serial bus for interconnecting automotive components
- FlexRay – a general purpose high-speed protocol with safety-critical features
- IDB-1394
- IEBus
- J1708 – RS-485 based SAE specification used in commercial vehicles, agriculture, and heavy equipment.
- J1939 and ISO11783 – an adaptation of CAN for agricultural and commercial vehicles
- Keyword Protocol 2000 (KWP2000) – a protocol for automotive diagnostic devices (runs either on a serial line or over CAN)
- Local Interconnect Network (LIN) – a very low cost in-vehicle sub-network
- Media Oriented Systems Transport (MOST) – a high-speed multimedia interface
- Vehicle Area Network (VAN)
- UAVCAN - a lightweight protocol for in-vehicle communication over CAN or Ethernet

== See also ==
- Lists of network protocols
- Protocol converter
- Serial communication
- Vehicle bus
