= Precision Time Protocol Industry Profile =

Part of IEC 62439-3 standard

Industrial automation systems consisting of several distributed controllers need a precise synchronization for commands, events and process data. For instance, motors for newspaper printing are synchronized within some 5 microseconds to ensure that the color pixels in the different cylinders come within 0.1 mm at a paper speed of some 20 m/s. Similar requirements exist in high-power semiconductors (e.g. for converting between AC and DC grids) and in drive-by-wire vehicles (e.g. cars with no mechanical steering wheel). This synchronisation is provided by the communication network, in most cases Industrial Ethernet. Many ad-hoc synchronization schemes exist, so IEEE published a standard Precision Time Protocol IEEE 1588 or "PTP", which allows sub-microsecond synchronization of clocks. PTP is formulated generally, so concrete applications need a stricter profile. In particular, PTP does not specify how the clocks should operate when the network is duplicated for better resilience to failures.

The PTP Industrial Profile (PIP) is a standard of the IEC 62439-3 that specifies in its Annex C two Precision Time Protocol IEEE 1588 / IEC 61588 profiles, L3E2E and L2P2P, to synchronize network clocks with an accuracy of 1 μs and provide fault-tolerance against clock failures.

The IEC 62439-3 PTP profiles are applicable to most Industrial Ethernet networks, for synchronized drives, robotics, vehicular technology and other applications that require precise time distribution, not necessarily using redundant networks.

The IEC 62439-3 profile L2P2P has been adopted as IEC/IEEE 61850-9-3 by the power utility industry to support precise time stamping of voltage and current measurement for differential protection, wide area monitoring and protection, busbar protection and event recording.

The IEC 62439-3 PTP profiles can be used to ensure deterministic operation of critical functions in the automation system itself, for instance precise starting of tasks, resource reservation and deadline supervision.

The IEC 62439-3 Annexes belongs to the Parallel Redundancy Protocol and High-availability Seamless Redundancy standard suite for high availability automation networks. However, this specification also applies to networks that have no redundancy and do not use PRP or HSR.

== Topology ==
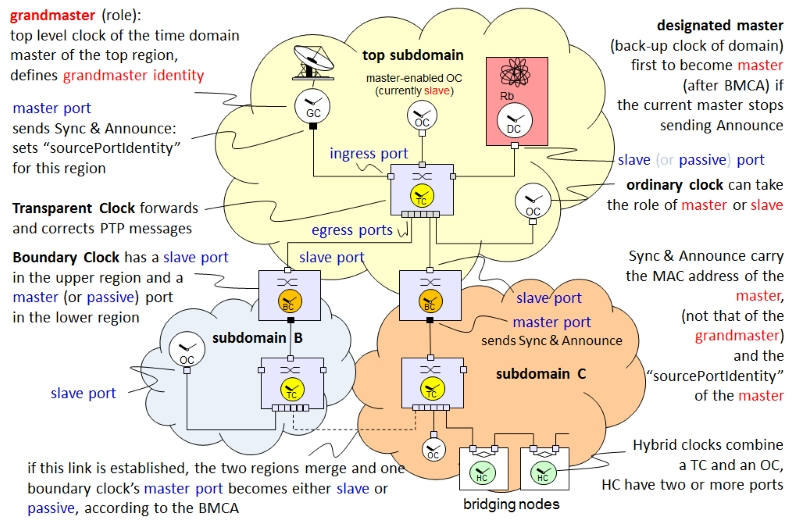
Elements in a 1588 network

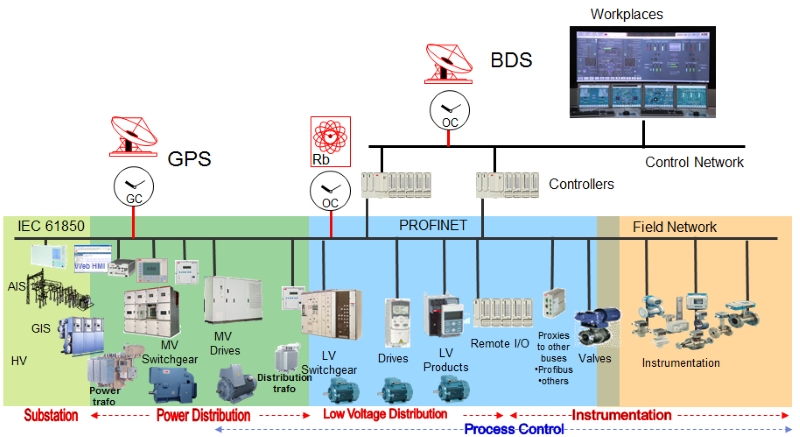
Industrial Network with precision clocks

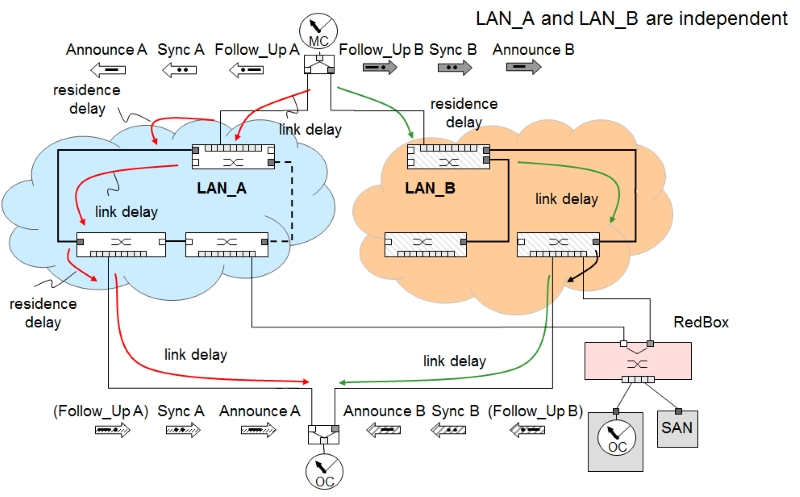
Doubly attached clocks in PRP

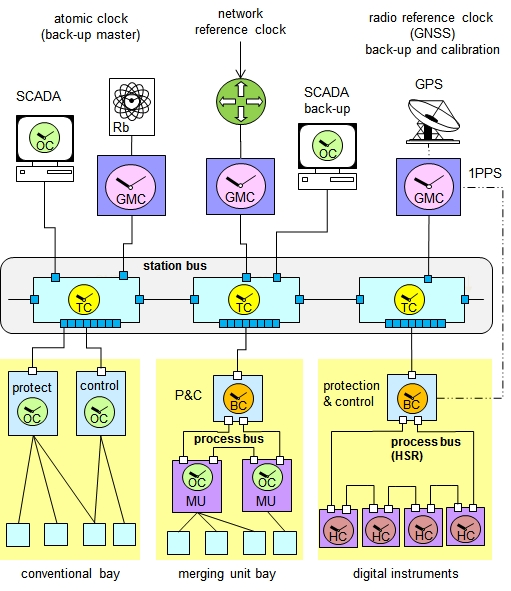
Hierarchy of PTP clocks in a substation

The PIP relies on the IEEE 1588 topology, consisting of grandmaster clocks (GC), ordinary clocks (OC), boundary clocks (BC), transparent clocks (TC) and hybrid clocks (HC = TC&OC).

For redundancy, a PIP network contains several clocks that are master-capable. Normally, the best master clock ensures that only one grandmaster broadcasts the time.

In redundant networks, and especially in PRP, several masters can be active at the same time, the slave then chooses its master.

== PIP Profiles and Annexes ==
- IEC 62439-3 Annex A specifies how to attach clocks to duplicated networks paths and how to support simultaneously active redundant master clocks for all profiles.
- IEC 62439-3 Annex B specifies the L2PTP profile for substation automation IEC/IEEE 61850-9-3. In contrast to IEC/IEEE 61850, double attachment by PRP or HSR is mandatory.
- IEC 62439-3 Annex C specifies two profiles, L3E2E and L2P2P, that are subsets of IEEE Std 1588 Precision Time Protocol (PTP) when clocks are singly attached.
- IEC 62439-3 Annex D is a tutorial for IEEE 1588 that concentrates only on PIP.
- IEC 62439-3 Annex E contains the SNMP objects for managing the doubly-attached clocks.

== Main features ==
IEC 62439-3 Annex C uses the following IEEE Std 1588 options:

- uses the PTP timescale based on TAI International Atomic Time, also delivers UTC Coordinated Universal Time
- transmits the clock correction indifferently with 1-step (preferred) or 2-step (can be mixed)
- operates with the default best master clock algorithm, performed by master and by slave clocks
- supports both options to measure the link delay:
  - L3E2E: End-to-end measurement (Delay_Req/Delay_Resp) over Layer 3 (Internet Protocol) to fulfill the requirements of ODVA;
  - L2P2P: Peer-to-peer measurement (Pdelay_Req/Pdelay_Resp) over Layer 2 Ethernet (IEEE 802.3) links.

== Performance ==
IEC 62439-3 Annex C aims at an accuracy of better than 1 μs after crossing 15 bridges with transparent clocks. It assumes that all network elements (bridges, routers, media converters, links) support PTP with a given performance:

- Grandmaster (GC): 250 ns maximum inaccuracy
- Transparent Clocks (TC): 50 ns maximum inaccuracy
- Boundary Clocks (BC): 200 ns maximum inaccuracy
- Media Converters: 50 ns maximum jitter and 25 ns maximum asymmetry
- Link asymmetry: 25 ns maximum asymmetry

By relying on these guaranteed values, the network engineer can calculate the time inaccuracy at different nodes of the network and place the clocks, especially the grandmaster clocks suitably. IEC TR 61850-90-4 (Network engineering guidelines) gives advice on the use of IEC/IEEE 61850-9-3 in substation automation networks.

== IEEE 1588 settings ==
IEC 62439-3 Annex C restricts the parameters of IEEE Std 1588 to the following values:

- domainNumber: 0 (default range)
- Announce interval: (default range) 1 s (L2P2P) or 2 s (L3E2E)
- Sync interval: 1 s (fixed)
- Pdelay interval: 1 s (fixed)
- Announce receipt time-out (number of Announce interval that has to pass without receipt of an Announce message before Announce timeout is issued): 3 (fixed)
- priority1: 255 for slave-only
- priority2: 255 for slave-only
- transparent clock primary syntonization domain: 0 (default)

== Additions to IEEE Std 1588 ==
IEC 62439-3 Annex C specifies requirements in addition to IEEE 1588:

- A clock shall accept both 1-step and 2-step corrections (improves plug-and-play)
- All clocks can be doubly attached using the IEC 62439-3 protocol (PRP "Parallel Redundancy Protocol" or HSR "High-availability Seamless Redundancy")
- Several master clocks can be active at the same time; the slave selects the best master.
- Time-outs ensure that the clocks can detect the loss of PTP messages also on the unused path.
- Identification of the peer node to check the topology of the network and ensure that all elements support the protocol.
- In network using store-and-forward media converters and for L2P2P only, the master appends a padding to Sync messages to ensure that Sync and Pdelay_Req/Pdelay_Resp messages have the same size (this will specified in IEEE 1588:2017)
- Network management by SNMP according to IEC 62439-3 Annex E

== Standard owners ==
This protocol has been developed by the IEC SC65C WG15 in the framework of IEC 62439, which applies to all IEC industrial networks. To avoid parallel standards in IEC and IEEE in the field of grid automation, the L2PTP profile specific to grid automation previous IEC 62439-3 Annex B has been placed under the umbrella of the IEC&IEEE Joint Development 61850-9-3. Technical responsibility rests with IEC SC65C WG15, which is committed to keep the IEC 62439-3 profile L2P2P and IEC/IEEE 61850-9-3 aligned.
