= Stack light =

Style of industrial warning lights

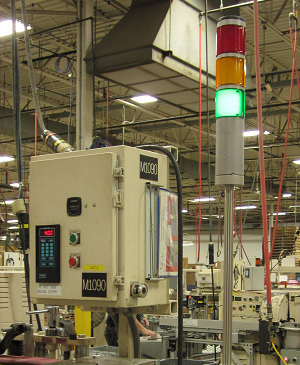
Stack light in automated production for in-line quality inspection

Stack lights (also known as signal tower lights, indicator lights, andon lights, warning lights, industrial signal lights, or tower lights) are commonly used on equipment in industrial manufacturing and process control environments to provide visual and audible indicators of a machine's status to machine operators, technicians, production managers and factory personnel. They are a form of andon: a manufacturing system that identifies errors as they happen.

== General ==
Stack lights are used in similar applications to beacon lights/strobes, however the information they typically display encompasses more machine/process conditions. Stack lights typically use incandescent, LED or xenon-type strobes as their illumination source.

Stack lights are generally columnar structures in a variety of shapes, placing colour-coded indicator segments on top of one another in a "stacked" orientation. A stack light will typically have up to five differently coloured segments to indicate various conditions on the machine or process.

Segments in any combination of (typically) red, yellow, green, blue or clear white are actuated independently and are either off, steadily lit, or flashing.

Stack lights are passive devices that may be controlled directly by programmable logic controllers, distributed control systems, PC control systems or hardwired to machine controls such as timers, sensors and latching relays.

Discrete signals activate illuminated segments at common industrial control voltages (including 12Vdc, 24Vac/dc, 115Vac, 230Vac). Some units support fieldbus networked control through popular industrial networks such as Modbus, DeviceNet, Profibus, CAN-Open or ASi.

Flashing control may be provided by the stack light's internal circuitry or externally controlled with timers or logic controllers.

Stack lights are available for all types of industrial environments including washdown (IP65) and explosion proof.

== Function ==
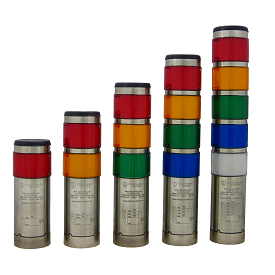
Various size stack lights

Stack lights are used in a variety of machines and process environments; specific colour-coding is assigned by the system designer.

Commonly used colour codes for machine state conditions include:

- RED: Failure conditions such as an emergency stop or machine fault
- AMBER: Warnings such as over-temperature or over-pressure conditions
- GREEN: Normal machine or process operation
- BLUE: External help request, where an operator might be requesting raw materials, scheduling or maintenance personnel assistance
- WHITE: User-defined conditions to a specific machine, often related to productivity monitoring
- Optionally an audible alarm buzzer, typically in the range of 70–105dB, may be added to alert machine operators to high priority conditions.

IEC60073 addresses machine state colour-coding & acoustic alerting, which can be applied to devices including panel pilot lights & stack lights. Machine operator intervention is typically required in red and yellow machine states, as these are normally errors or warnings. Manual intervention is possibly necessary in blue and white conditions.

== Applications ==
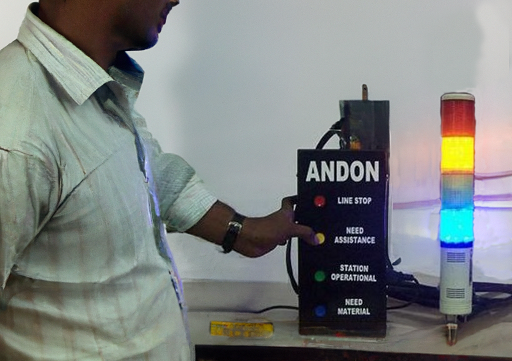
Demonstration by technician in Colgate Palmolive of how the Andon Button works

Common applications include, but are not limited to:

- Productivity monitoring (often rate-based machine output management with parts-per-hour displays). Uptime & downtime monitoring (overall equipment effectiveness) is a very common use for these devices.
- Warning indication and machine fault management
- Lean manufacturing - 5S Initiatives
- In conjunction with SCADA supervisory control systems and user interface/HMIs: SCADA/HMIs provide more specific machine/process status data; stack lights complement them by providing visual/audible feedback away from the machine operator console.
- Assembly station workcells
- Maintenance call stations
- CNC machining equipment and process monitoring and feedback
- Broadcast studios (commonly used in broadcast radio studios) to display status of things such as a studio on air, live microphones, phone calls and even as a doorbell in an environment where silent indication is critical.
- Dispatch centers where the dispatcher frequently uses a headset making it difficult to tell when the dispatcher is on the phone or radio. The light will light one color when the radio is keyed and another when on the phone.

== See also ==
- Andon (manufacturing)
- IEC 60073:2002 Basic and safety principles for man-machine interface, marking and identification - Coding principles for indicators and actuators https://webstore.iec.ch/publication/587
- http://talk.electricianforum.co.uk/downloads/89021-Light%20colours%20from%2060204-1.pdf
- Engineering/Installation Reference Guide, https://web.archive.org/web/20160304080801/http://www.onyx-industries.com/downloads/StackLightEngineeringReferenceGuide.pdf
- Lean Manufacturing "Andon", https://www.workerbase.com/post/the-definitive-guide-to-modern-lean-manufacturing-andon-systems
- Lean Manufacturing Glossary, http://www.gembutsu.com/articles/leanmanufacturingglossary.html
- Table 3 related to Pilot & Indicator Light Color Coding: http://wp10625799.vwp6873.webpack.hosteurope.de/rafi.de/index.php?id=841&L=1
