= BSAP =

BSAP may refer to:

- B-cell-specific activator protein
- Baltic Sea Action Plan, Helsinki Committee
- Basic Strategic Art Program
- Bone-specific alkaline phosphatase
- Brigade for the Security of Protected Areas - Haitian paramilitary force linked to Guy Philippe
- British Society of Animal Science, formerly British Society of Animal Production
- British South Africa Police
- Bristol Standard Asynchronous Protocol
