= EIB =

EIB may refer to:

== Science and technology ==
- Earth's energy imbalance, a condition of unequal inflow of energy to, and outflow of energy from, Earth's climate system
- Element Interconnect Bus, on a Cell microprocessor
- European Installation Bus, a communications protocol
- Exbibyte, a unit of digital information

== Other uses ==
- EIB Network, the syndication network for The Rush Limbaugh Show
- European Investment Bank, the European Union's financing institution
- Even in Blackouts, an American band
- Exercise-induced bronchoconstriction
- Expert Infantryman Badge, of the United States Army
- Exportbank, a Philippine commercial bank
- Extreme Ironing Bureau, the governing body of the tongue-in-cheek sport of extreme ironing
