= ODVA =

ODVA may refer to:

- Oklahoma Department of Veterans Affairs
- Oregon Department of Veterans' Affairs
- ODVA (company) (formerly Open DeviceNet Vendors Association, Inc.), founded 1995, a global trade and standard development organization whose members are suppliers of devices for industrial automation applications.
