= DF-1 =

DF-1 may refer to:

- DF-1 Protocol, a protocol used to communicate with most Allen Bradley RS232 interface modules
- Dongfeng-1, a missile
- Avimech Dragonfly DF-1, an American helicopter design
- DF1 (Digitales Fernsehen 1), the first digital television company in Germany
