= EGD =

EGD may refer to:

- Engadine railway station, in Sydney, Australia
- Equality-generating dependency
- Esophagogastroduodenoscopy
- Ethernet Global Data Protocol
- Engineering Graphics and Design, an educational subject that focuses on the development of technical drawing skills
- The Enthropy Gathering Daemon, software
