= FINS =

FINS may refer to:

- Factory Interface Network Service, a network protocol.
- Fire Island National Seashore, a United States National Seashore that protects a 26-mile (42 km) section of Fire Island, an approximately 30-mile (48 km) long barrier island separated from Long Island by the Great South Bay.
