= Media Redundancy Protocol =

Fault recovery system for Ethernet

Figure 1: MRP ring in Ring-Closed status

Figure 2: MRP ring in Ring-Open status

Media Redundancy Protocol (MRP) is a data network protocol standardized by the International Electrotechnical Commission as IEC 62439-2. It allows rings of Ethernet switches to overcome any single failure with recovery time much faster than achievable with Spanning Tree Protocol. It is suitable to most industrial Ethernet applications.

== Properties ==
MRP operates at the data link layer (OSI Layer 2) of Ethernet switches and is a direct evolution of the HiPER-Ring protocol developed by Hirschmann in 1998. Hirschmann is now owned by Belden. MRP is supported by several commercial industrial Ethernet switches.

In an MRP ring, the ring manager is named Media Redundancy Manager (MRM), while ring clients are named Media Redundancy Clients (MRCs).

MRM and MRC ring ports support three statuses: disabled, blocked, and forwarding:

- Disabled ring ports drop all the received frames. They also do not send any frames.
- Blocked ring ports drop all the received frames except the MRP control frames. They also do not send any frames except MRP control frames.
- Forwarding ring ports receive all frames and also forward the received frames.

During normal operation, the network works in the Ring-Closed status (Figure 1). In this status, one of the MRM ring ports is blocked, while the other is forwarding. Conversely, both ring ports of all MRCs are forwarding. Loops are avoided because the physical ring topology is reduced to a logical line topology.

In case of failure, the network works in the Ring-Open status (Figure 2). For instance, in case of failure of a link connecting two MRCs, the MRM sets both of its ring ports to the forwarding state; the MRCs adjacent to the failure each have a disabled port (because of the link loss) and a forwarding ring port; the other MRCs have both ring ports forwarding. Also, in the Ring-Open status, the network logical topology is a line.

== Frame structure ==
MRP information is sent in the form of an Ethernet frame, with the EtherType field set to 0x88E3. The frames are built by Type–length–value (TLV) structures, allowing organizationally specific information.

== Standards ==
The International Electrotechnical Commission standard for MRP was published in 2010 as IEC 62439-2 and amended in 2012.

The standard IEC 62439 published in 2012 also defined the following protocols:

- Parallel Redundancy Protocol (PRP)
- Cross-network Redundancy Protocol - CRP
- Beacon Redundancy Protocol - BRP
- High-availability Seamless Redundancy (HSR)

With the settings specified in IEC 62439-2, MRP guarantees a worst-case recovery time of 500 ms, 200 ms, or 30 ms in rings composed of up to 50 switches, and a worst-case recovery time of 10 ms in rings composed of up to 14 switches.

== See also ==
- Fieldbus
