= Service Request Transport Protocol =

Service Request Transport Protocol (GE-SRTP) was developed by GE Intelligent Platforms (earlier GE Fanuc) for the transfer of data from programmable logic controllers. The protocol is used over Ethernet almost all GE automation equipment supports the GE-SRTP protocol when equipped with an Ethernet port. Any SRTP client will be capable of reading and writing system memory of any number of remote SRTP capable devices.

== See also ==
- Computer network
- Computer science
