= Andon (manufacturing) =

Alerting system for quality control

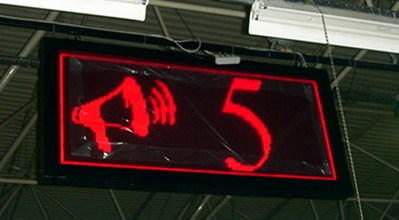
Signboard

In manufacturing, andon (Japanese: アンドン or あんどん or 行灯) is a system which notifies managerial, maintenance, and other workers of a quality or process problem. The alert can be activated manually by a worker using a pullcord or button or may be activated automatically by the production equipment itself. The system may include a means to pause production so the issue can be corrected. Some modern alert systems incorporate audio alarms, text, or other displays; stack lights are among the most commonly used.

“Andon” is a loanword from Japanese, originally meaning paper lantern; Japanese manufacturers began its quality-control usage.

== Details ==
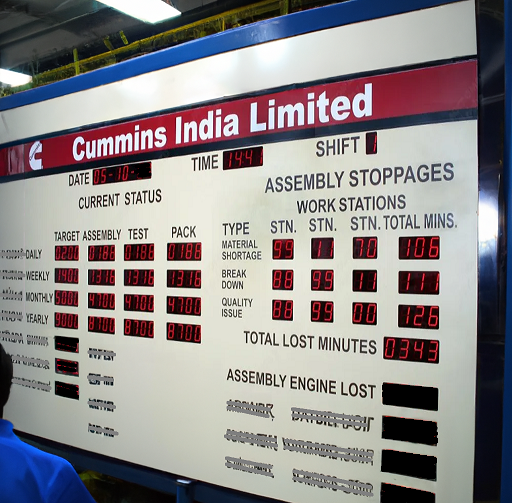
Andon board displays used inside Cummins India Limited

An andon system is one of the principal elements of the Jidoka quality control method pioneered by Toyota as part of the Toyota Production System and therefore now part of the lean production approach.

The andon cord is commonly understood as a single-pull system used to stop the production line immediately when a problem arises. However, at Toyota—where the concept originated—the process is more nuanced. Toyota’s traditional andon system often involves two distinct pulls: the first pull serves as a request for help, alerting the team leader without stopping the line. This gives the leader time to assess and resolve the issue. If the issue can be resolved, a second pull is made, which keeps the line moving along. Otherwise, the line will stop.

Since 2014, Toyota is slowly replacing the andon cord with "andon button" as it can be operated wirelessly and reduce the clutter mess of tangling cables in production floor which leads to avoidance of tripping incidents in production floor. It gives workers the ability, and moreover the empowerment, to stop production when a defect is found, and immediately call for assistance. Common reasons for manual activation of the andon are:

- Part shortage
- Defects created or found
- Tools/machines malfunction
- Existence of a safety problem.

All work in production line is stopped until a solution has been found. The alerts may be logged to a database so that they can be studied as part of a continual improvement process. Once the problem is troubleshot and fixed, a second pull of the andon cord authorizes the production to be resumed.

The system typically indicates where the alert was generated, and may also provide a description of the issue. Modern andon systems can include text, graphics, or audio elements. Audio alerts may be done with coded tones, music with different tunes corresponding to the various alerts, or prerecorded verbal messages.

== History ==
The concept/process of giving a non-management (production line) worker the authority to stop the production line because of a suspected quality issue is often attributed to W. Edwards Deming and others who developed what became Kaizen after World War II. Many attribute Japan's rise from wartime ashes to the world's second largest economy (the Japanese economic miracle) to their post-war industrial innovations:

- Better design of products to improve service
- Higher level of uniform product quality
- Improvement of product testing in the workplace and in research centers
- Greater sales through side [global] markets

== See also ==
- Traditional lighting equipment of Japan § Andon
- Stack light (commonly used in andon and lean manufacturing initiatives)
