= Optomux =

1982 Network protocol

Optomux is a serial (RS-422/RS485) network protocol originally developed by Opto 22 in 1982 which is used for industrial automation applications. Optomux is an ASCII protocol consisting of command messages and response messages containing data from an Optomux unit & contain a message checksum to ensure secure communications. The serial data link is very reliable, over distances up to 4,000 feet and is suitable for extreme safety applications. An Optomux system is typically made up of three main elements:

- There must be a host device to poll the Optomux brain boards.
- There are the brain boards themselves, anywhere from one to 255 of them.
- Each Optomux brain board attaches to an I/O mounting rack, carrying the individual I/O modules.

== Limitation ==
The primary performance limitation of the Optomux system is the slow serial data link. The maximum data rate supported by the Optomux brain boards is 38.4 kbit/s (also dependent on the length of the communication lines). In theory, at maximum speed, the Optomux system should be capable of polling roughly 3,400 digital positions per second, or roughly 600 analog positions per second. This is assuming that all the positions are on the same brain board, which is not possible with Optomux. A more realistic speed figure would be about half of the previous numbers. For faster serial data communication, Opto 22's Mistic protocol and hardware may be used at speeds to 115.2 kbit/s. Or, a B3000 brain using the Optomux protocol can communicate at similar high speeds.
