= AS-International =

Nonprofit trade association

- Company type: Member organization trade association
- Founded: 1991
- Founder: Companies: Balluff, Festo, ifm electronic, Leuze Electronic, Pepperl+Fuchs, Sick, Siemens, Turck, Visolux (now part of the Pepperl+Fuchs group), Baumer, Elesta
- Headquarters: Gelnhausen, Deutschland
- Area served: Worldwide with representations in Belgium, Brazil, China, Czech Republic, France, Germany, Great Britain, Italy, Japan, Korea, The Netherlands, Sweden, Switzerland, USA
- Website: as-international

AS-International is the nonprofit trade association for AS-Interface (Actuator/Sensor-Interface, short: AS-i) users worldwide.

AS-International is the sole owner of the registered trademark AS-Interface, and only members may develop and sell products using AS-Interface technology. The association also controls the certification process, and grants the right to use the AS-Interface logo on printed and electronic material as well as the products themselves. AS-International represents a worldwide community of approximately 350 members. At this time, in addition to the headquarters in Gelnhausen, Germany, 13 independently structured local organizations on three continents exist.

== History ==
In 1990, eleven German (Balluff, Festo, ifm electronic, Leuze electronic, Pepperl+Fuchs, Sick, Siemens, Turck, Visolux (now part of the Pepperl+Fuchs group) and Swiss (Baumer, and Elesta) companies conceived a bus system for networking sensors and actuators. These industrial companies, with different strategic and economic interests, and frequently competing, jointly conceived the AS-Interface technology. Funded in part by the BMBF (formerly BMFT- German Federal Ministry of Research and Technology,) their goal was the development of a simple and low-cost system. In 1991, after the completion of this work, an independent, nonprofit user organization, the Association for Promotion of Bus-compatible Interfaces e.V., now doing business as AS-International e.V., was founded. This was necessary to address legislation concerning anti-competitive business practices. The developing companies effectively relinquished their rights in the core technology. Consequently and as stated in its constitution, AS-International is the owner and guardian of the trademark AS-Interface®, and owns the rights and the specification to the AS-Interface technology. Therefore, any company producing technology with AS-Interface products is required to be a member of AS-International Association. Additionally, the organization represents the technology in international regulatory bodies, organizes and hosts educational seminars, and promotes advancements of the technology. According to AS-International, the organization's mission is the promotion of bus-able interfaces for sensors and actuators.

In the fall of 1991, the detailed specification was approved, allowing AS-International members to start developing slave components.

By mid 1992, the electro-mechanical specification was released, defining the AS-Interface flat-cable, an essential component to addressing the goal of simple network installations.

Mid 1992, the master specification was released, resulting in the development of a number of bus masters with and without interfaces to other higher-level ‘’fieldbus’’ solutions.

In the fall of 1993, the first application-specific integrated circuit (ASIC) became available, simplifying slave development and passing performance testing.

In early 1994, the first fully functional circuit and prototypes became available.

Mid 1994, FZI Forschungszentrum Informatik in Karlsruhe – research institute for computer science in Karlsruhe) developed the first systems with master.

In 1999, AS-Interface is standardized in EN 50295 and IEC 62026-2 (revised in 2012.)

In 2010, AS-International introduced AS-Interface Power 24V, enabling the use of almost any 24V power supply for AS-Interface.

In July 2012, the Developer Kit for AS-Interface to create a fully functional as-Interface network was released.

== Member services ==
As a trade association based on common interest, AS-International offers its members:

- Certification of AS-Interface products
- Market and technology information
- Use of the logo and the name AS-Interface
- Updates concerning technical documentation
- Technical support
- User seminars and presentations, workshops, trade shows, press conferences, advertisements
