= European Home Systems Protocol =

European Home Systems (EHS) Protocol was a communication protocol aimed at home appliances control and communication using power line communication (PLC), developed by the European Home Systems Association (EHSA).

After merging with two other protocols, it is a part of the KNX standard, which complies with the European Committee for Electrotechnical Standardization (CENELEC) norm EN 50090 and has a chance to be a basis for the first open standard for home and building control.

== See also ==
- Building automation
- Home automation
