= Multi-Point Interface =

The Multi-Point Interface – Siemens (MPI) is a proprietary interface of the programmable logic controller SIMATIC S7 of the company Siemens.

It is used for connecting the stations programming (PC or personal computer), operator consoles, and other devices in the SIMATIC family. This technology has inspired the development of protocol Profibus.

The MPI is based on the standard EIA-485 (formerly RS-485) and works with a speed from 187.5 kBd to 12 MBd.

The network MPI must have resistance at the end of the line and it is generally included in the connector and activated by a simple switch.

Manufacturers using MPI technology offer a range of connections to a PC: MPI cards, PCMCIA cards, USB adapters or Ethernet.
