= Factory Interface Network Service =

FINS, Factory Interface Network Service, is a network protocol used by Omron PLCs, over different physical networks like Ethernet, Controller Link, DeviceNet and RS-232C.

The FINS communications service was developed by Omron to provide a consistent way for PLCs and computers on various networks to communicate. Compatible network types include Ethernet, Host Link, Controller Link, SYSMAC LINK, SYSMAC WAY, and Toolbus. FINS allows communications between nodes up to three network levels. A direct connection between a computer and a PLC via Host Link is not considered a network level.
