= Common Industrial Protocol =

Protocol for industrial automation applications

The Common Industrial Protocol (CIP) is an industrial protocol for industrial automation applications. It is supported by ODVA.

Previously known as Control and Information Protocol, CIP encompasses a comprehensive suite of messages and services for the collection of manufacturing automation applications – control, safety, synchronization, motion, configuration and information. It allows users to integrate these manufacturing applications with enterprise-level Ethernet networks and the Internet. It is supported by hundreds of vendors around the world, and is media-independent. CIP provides a unified communication architecture throughout the manufacturing enterprise. It is used in EtherNet/IP, DeviceNet, CompoNet and ControlNet.

ODVA is the organization that supports network technologies built on the Common Industrial Protocol (CIP). These also currently include application extensions to CIP: CIP Safety, CIP Motion and CIP Sync.
