= MelsecNet =

Protocol for data delivery

MelsecNet is a protocol developed and supported by Mitsubishi Electric for data delivery. MelsecNet supports 239 networks.

MelsecNet protocol has two variants. MELSECNET/H and its predecessor MELSECNET/10 use high speed and redundant functionality to give deterministic delivery of large data volumes. Both variants can use either coaxial bus type or optical loop type for transmission. Coaxial bus type uses the token bus method with an overall distance of 500 metres (550 yd) but optical loop type uses the Token Ring method and can support a distance up to 30 kilometres (19 miles). MELSECNET/H can support a maximum of 19,200 bytes/frame and a maximum communication speed of 25 Mbit/s. MELSECNET/10 supports 960 bytes/frame and a baud rate of 10 Mbit/s. Mitsubishi provides a manual for both the variants Melsecnet/H and MelsecNet/10.

== Features ==
- Easy personal computer, HMI and PLC connection
- High-speed data communications with large data volumes
- Reliable and robust data transfers
- Redundancy functions
- 10/25 megabaud data transfer rates
- Maximum network distance 30 km, up to 255 segments
- Simple configuration, remote programming
- Floating master
