= SynqNet =

SynqNet is an industrial automation network launched in 2001 by Danaher Corporation for meeting the performance and safety requirements of machine control applications. Synqnet is built over Ethernet link and 100BASE-TX physical layer and provides a synchronous connection between various process automation devices including motion controllers, servo drives, stepper drives and I/O modules. As of September 2008, SynqNet networks are used for controlling over 400,000 axes of motion on various motion applications worldwide. SynqNet user group is formed in 2004 for enhancing the developments.
