= Sinec H1 =

Ethernet protocol

Sinec H1 is an Industrial Ethernet communications protocol that provides the transport layer function widely used in automation and process control applications. The protocol was developed by Siemens and is used mainly for control applications. It has large bandwidth and is well suited to the transmission of large volumes of data.

It is used as part of the control infrastructure of CERN and LHC.

== See also ==
- Computer networking
- Industrial control systems
