= BatiBUS =

Network protocol for building automation

BatiBus was a network protocol for building automation that was introduced in 1989 and has since been succeeded by KNX. It was a relatively simple low-cost protocol that did not rely on dedicated chips.

The system was run by the BatiBus Club International (BCI), which was founded by the Swiss company Landis & Gyr and the French companies AIRELEC, Electricité de France and Merlin Gerin (who originated the concept). Predominantly used in France and captured by French Electrical Standard NF C 46620, it provided layers 1, 2 and 7 of the OSI model. Approximately 500,000 BatiBus network units were installed, mainly in France.

BatiBus communicated over twisted pair lines and in topologies that could be divided into several segments. Each segment was powered with a 15 volt power supply rated at 150 milliamps. A device (node) could be reached at one of 240 possible addresses. In addition, 16 group addresses could be established under which all nodes in a group could be reached. The nodes avoided data collisions via CSMA/CA and had data flow controls. The maximum data transfer rate was 4800 bits/s.
