= Ethernet Global Data Protocol =

Automation Protocol

Ethernet Global Data (EGD) is a protocol that enables producer (server) to share a portion of its memory to all the consumers (clients) at a scheduled periodic rate. This protocol is developed for GE Fanuc PLCs to exchange data between PLCs / Drive Systems / HMI/SCADA systems. The protocol uses UDP over Ethernet layers for exchanging the data. A snapshot of internal reference memory, mediated by an Ethernet interface, is referred to as an exchange. An exchange does not require a reply and is identified by a unique combination of three major identifiers.

- The Producer ID (the producer's IP address)
- The Exchange ID (the exchange's identifier)
- The Adapter Name (the Ethernet interface identifier)

EGD is implemented using classes.

- Class 0 - supports configured exchanges only (implemented in most PACSystems CPUs)
- Class 1 - supports all class 0 services plus programmed EGD exchanges that can be used to read and write other devices on an ad-hoc basis
- Class 2 - supports all class 1 services plus acts as a responder for programmed EGD exchanges (implemented by Ethernet interface module only)
- Class 3 - supports all class 2 services plus static configuration from an EGD configuration server
- Class 4 - supports all class 3 services plus dynamically bound configuration from an EGD configuration server
