= SDS Protocol =

Smart Distributed System (SDS) protocol was developed by Honeywell and is supported by Holjeron. SDS is an open event-driven protocol used over Controller area network based industrial networks. It is used for a highly reliable Smart device-level network. The SDS Application Layer Protocol is optimized for smart sensors and actuators, where configuration, diagnostic, and process information can be embedded cost-effectively in a very small footprint.

== Key features ==
- Supports communication rates up to 1 Mbit/s.
- 1500 ft maximum distance at 125 kbit/s (longer with Bridge).
- Can support 64 maximum electrical loads (Nodes) per network without repeater & 126 with repeater.
- Uses 12-24VDC, 2 power wires + 2 communication wires + shield
- Multiple physical layer topologies
- Can have 126 logical addresses (logical devices) - not related to physical location on the network
- Each logical device can have 32 objects containing attributes, actions and events
- Proven event driven architecture for maximum throughput (<1ms)
- Event-Driven, Master-Slave, Multicast and Peer-to-peer Services
- Network heartbeat to ensure device health every 2.5 seconds
- Have Robust Network Management capabilities (Microsoft architecture)
