= HostLink Protocol =

Communication protocol

HostLink is communication protocol for use with or between PLC's made by Omron. It is an ASCII-based protocol generally used for communication over RS-232 or RS-422. The protocol enables communication between various pieces of equipment in an industrial environment for programming or controlling those pieces of equipment. The maximum allowed message size is 30 words per message. Larger messages can be sent by 'fragmentation' process, where the same slave returns a series of messages to build up the entire response. PLC host computers can transfer procedures, and monitor PLC data area, and control the PLC using the HostLink protocol.
