= IEC/IEEE 61850-9-3 =

International standard for time synchronisation

IEC/IEEE 61850-9-3 (Power Utility Profile) or PUP is an international standard for precise time distribution and clock synchronization in electrical grids with an accuracy of 1 μs. It supports precise time stamping of voltage and current measurement for differential protection, wide area monitoring and protection, busbar protection and event recording. It can be used to ensure deterministic operation of critical functions in the automation system. It belongs to the IEC 61850 standard suite for communication networks and systems for power utility automation.

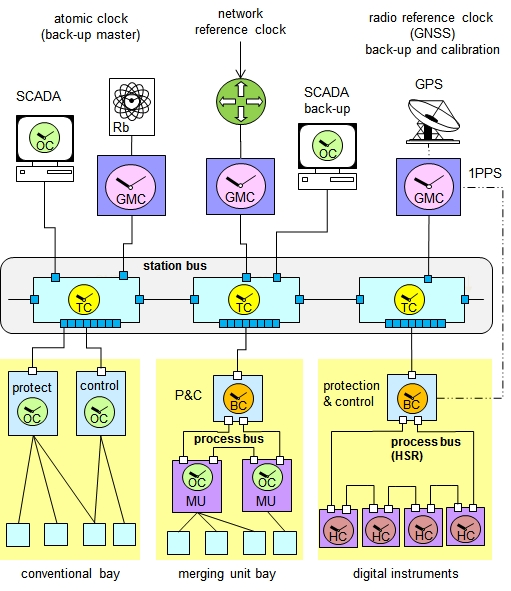
Hierarchy of PTP clocks in a substation

IEC/IEEE 61850-9-3 is a profile (subset) of IEEE Std 1588 Precision Time Protocol (PTP) when clocks are singly attached.

IEC/IEEE 61850-9-3 provides seamless fault tolerance by attaching clocks to duplicated networks paths and by support of simultaneously active redundant master clocks. For this case, the extensions to PTP defined in IEC 62439-3 Annex A apply.

== Main features ==
IEC/IEEE 61850-9-3 uses the following IEEE Std 1588 options:

- uses the PTP timescale based on TAI International Atomic Time, also delivers UTC Coordinated Universal Time
- communicates on Layer 2 over Ethernet (IEEE 802.3) links, either in a local area network or in a wide area network (Metro-Ethernet)
- measures the link delay by peer-to-peer (Pdelay) message exchange
- transmits the clock correction indifferently in 1-step (preferred) or in 2-step
- operates with the default best master clock algorithm, performed by master and by slave clocks

== Performance ==
IEC/IEEE 61850-9-3 aims at an accuracy of better than 1 μs after crossing 15 bridges with transparent clocks.
It assumes that all network elements (bridges, routers, media converters, links) support PTP with a given performance:

- Grandmaster (GC): 250 ns maximum inaccuracy
- Transparent Clocks (TC): 50 ns maximum inaccuracy
- Boundary Clocks (BC): 200 ns maximum inaccuracy
- Media Converters: 50 ns maximum jitter and 25 ns maximum asymmetry
- Link asymmetry: 25 ns maximum asymmetry

By relying on these guaranteed values, the network engineer can calculate the time inaccuracy at different nodes of the network and place the clocks, especially the grandmaster clocks suitably.
IEC TR 61850-90-4 (Network engineering guidelines) gives advice on the use of IEC/IEEE 61850-9-3.

== IEEE 1588 settings ==
IEC/IEEE 61850-9-3 restricts the parameters of IEEE Std 1588 to the following values:

- domainNumber: 0 (default), 93 (when conflict exist with another PTP time distribution)
- Announce interval: 1 s (fixed)
- Sync interval: 1 s (fixed)
- Pdelay interval: 1 s (fixed)
- Announce receipt time-out: 3 s (fixed)
- priority1: 255 for slave-only
- priority2: 255 for slave-only
- transparent clock primary syntonization domain: 0 (default)

== Additions to IEEE Std 1588 ==
- All clocks can be doubly attached using the IEC 62439-3 protocol (PRP "Parallel Redundancy Protocol" or HSR "High-availability Seamless Redundancy").
- Several master clocks can be active at the same time; the slave selects the best master.
- Time-outs ensure that the clocks can detect the loss of PTP messages also on the unused path.
- Identification of the peer node to check the topology of the network and ensure that all elements support the protocol.
- In network using store-and-forward media converters, the master appends a padding to Sync messages to ensure that Sync and Pdelay_Req/Pdelay_Resp messages have the same size (this will specified in IEEE 1588:2017)
- Network management by SNMP according to IEC 62439-3 Annex E or by IEC 61850 consider the extension

== Local time distribution ==
For applications that do not use the corresponding function in IEC 61850, the grandmaster may distribute local time (e.g. for human display) using the ALTERNATE_TIME_OFFSET_INDICATOR TLV as specified in IEEE Std 1588 §16.3.

== Standard owners ==
This protocol has been developed 2012-2014 by the IEC SC65C WG15 in the framework of IEC 62439-3, which applies to all IEC industrial networks, as PTP profile L2P2P (Layer2, peer-to-peer). To avoid parallel standards in IEC and IEEE in the field of grid automation, this work has been placed under the umbrella of the IEC&IEEE Joint Development 61850-9-3. Technical responsibility rests with IEC SC65C WG15, which is committed to keep the IEC 62439-3 profile L2P2P and IEC/IEEE 61850-9-3 aligned.
