= DirectNET Protocol =

Koyo DirectNET protocol is used by DirectLOGIC PLCs from Automation Direct and is used in APS vacuum controls since 1999. It is a master/slave protocol making use of RS-232 or RS-422 physical layers with a baud rate from 300 to 38,400. It is designed to drive a maximum of 90 PLCs on a serial line.
