= DF-1 Protocol =

DF-1 / DF1 protocol is an asynchronous byte-oriented protocol that is used to communicate with most Allen Bradley RS-232 interface modules. DF1 protocol consists of link layer and application layer formats. DF1 works over half duplex and full duplex modes of communication.

== Application layer messages ==
Application layer message format consists of Command Initiator messages (request messages) and Command Executor (reply messages). Important command initiator messages are as follows.

- apply port configuration
- bit write
- change mode
- close file
- diagnostic status
- disable forces
- disable outputs
- download request
- echo
- enable outputs
- enable PLC scanning
- enter download mode
- enter upload mode
- exit download/upload mode
- file read
- file write
- get edit resource
- initialize memory
- modify PLC-2 compatibility file
- open file
- physical read
- physical write
- read bytes physical
- read diagnostic counters
- reset diagnostic counters
- read link parameters
- read-modify-write
- read section size
- restart request
- set CPU mode
- set data table size
- set ENQs
- set link parameters
- set NAKs
- set timeout
- set variables
- shutdown

== See also ==
- Computer networking
- Computer science
