= EN 50090 =

EN 50090 is a European standard for Home and Building Electronic Systems (HBES) open communications, issued by CENELEC. It covers any combination of electronic devices linked via a digital transmission network to provide automated, decentralised and distributed process control for domestic and commercial and building applications; for example, the control of lighting, heating, food preparation, washing, energy management, water, fire alarms, blinds, security, etc.

== Part 1: Standardization structure ==
- EN 50090-1:2011

== Part 2: System overview ==
- EN 50090-2-1:1996 : Architecture - withdrawn and replaced by EN 50090-1:2011
- EN 50090-2-2:1996 & A2:2007 : General technical requirements (concerns cabling and topology, electrical and functional safety, environmental conditions and behavior in case of failures as well as specific installation rules) - partially replaced by EN IEC 63044-3:2018 Home and Building Electronic Systems (HBES) and Building Automation and Control Systems (BACS). Electrical safety requirements, EN 50491-5-2:2010 Environmental conditions, EN 50491-5-3:2010 and EN 50491-5-1:2010 EMC requirements
- EN 50090-2-3:2005 : General functional safety requirements - withdrawn and replaced by EN 50491-4-1:2012

== Part 3: Aspects of application ==
- EN 50090-3-1:1994 : Introduction to the application structure
- EN 50090-3-2:2004 : User process for HBES Class 1, twisted pair (asynchronous character-oriented data transfer in a half duplex bi-directional communication mode, using a specifically unbalanced/unsymmetrical (Type 0) or balanced/symmetrical (Type 1) baseband signal coding with collision avoidance under SELV conditions)
- EN 50090-3-3:2009 : Interworking model and common data types (so that different manufacturers' products send and receive datagrams and are able to properly understand and react on them without the need for translators or gateways as well as common configuration tools, training, etc.)
- EN 50090-3-4:2017: Secure application layer, secure service, secure configuration and security resources (based on ISO/IEC 24767-2 Home Network Secure Communication Protocol for Middleware - important for anti-intrusion security)

== Part 4: Media independent layers ==
- EN 50090-4-1:2004 : Application layer for HBES Class 1 (specifies services that can be used for both management and run-time communication)
- EN 50090-4-2:2004 : Transport layer, network layer and general parts of data link layer for HBES Class 1 (provides the communication stack for the data link layer, the network layer and the transport layer)
- EN 50090-4-3:2015 : Communication over IP

== Part 5: Media and media dependent layers ==
- EN 50090-5-1:2005 : Power line for HBES Class 1 (defines the medium-specific physical and data link layer of power line Class 1 in two variations, PL110 and PL132)
- EN 50090-5-2:2004 : Network based on HBES Class1 (defines the medium-specific physical and data link layer for twisted pair in its two variations, TP0 and TP1)
- EN 50090-5-3 2006 : Radio frequency (defines requirements for the RF physical and data link layer)

== Part 6: Interfaces ==
- EN 50090-6-1:2017 : Webservice interface (defines a standardized web service-based interface with other IT systems via a gateway device)

== Part 7: System Management ==
- EN 50090-7-1:2004 : Management procedures (capturing the dynamics of managing distributed resources on the network in terms of a sequence of telegrams, exchanged between two partners: the management client and the management server)

== Part 8: Conformity assessment ==
- EN 50090-8:2000 : Conformity assessment of products

== Part 9: Installation requirements ==
- EN 50090-9-1:2004 : Generic cabling for HBES Class 1 (provides cabling planning and installation rules taking into account the layout of the cable support, cables and connectors, and commissioning)
