= Opto 22 =

Manufacturing company

Opto 22 is a manufacturing company specializing in hardware and software products for industrial automation, remote monitoring, and data acquisition. The company is based in Southern California and sells solid state relays and Ethernet-based input/output systems and controllers. It is based in Temecula, California.

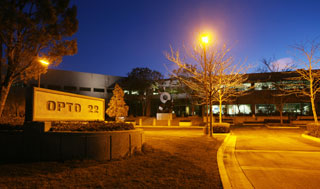
Opto 22 Headquarters in Temecula, CA USA

== History ==
Opto 22 was founded in 1974 as a manufacturer of solid state relays. The company soon expanded its offerings to include a variety of computer-based industrial automation, remote monitoring, and data acquisition products. In 1978, Opto 22 developed the first computer-based plug-in I/O modules, and created the Yellow-Black-White-Red color scheme used to identify digital AC input, digital AC output, digital DC input, and digital DC output modules respectively.

In 1982, the company created Optomux, a serial-based I/O system using the ASCII protocol. The following year, with the introduction of the personal computer prompting a shift in the automation industry to PC-based control, Opto 22 developed what was to be the first in a series of software packages for designing control strategies on a PC using flowcharts. This provided a new alternative to the more popular ladder logic programming model. Later, Opto 22 introduced the mistic controller, which had many of the same features and functionality of a modern programmable logic controller.

Opto 22 markets the SNAP brand of Ethernet products, including industrial processors, controllers, I/O racks and modules, software and accessories. In 2007 the company introduced the SNAP PAC System, adding higher powered controllers with redundant Ethernet communications, new programming and human machine interface development software, higher density I/O modules, database connectivity tools and software that simulated the SNAP PAC controller hardware. The result was a suite of control system components, suitable for simple cell control or complex, distributed control architectures.
