= Instabus =

Open system to manage and control electrical

Instabus, is a decentralized open system to manage and control electrical devices within a facility. It is developed by Berker, Gira, Jung, Merten and Siemens AG. There are about 200 companies of electrical supplies using this communication protocol. The European Installation Bus (EIB) allows all electrical components to be interconnected through an electrical bus. Every component is able to send commands to other components, no matter where they are. A typical EIB network is made of electrical components such as switches, pulsers, electric motors, electrovalves, contactors, and sensors.

This electrical bus is made of a 2x2x0,8mm twisted pair cable, that connects all devices within the network. The theoretical maximum number of components is 57375.

EIB system was developed to increase power savings, security, comfort and flexibility.

== System control ==
Although the EIB is a decentralized system and doesn't need any electric switchboard or control console, it's possible to implement a PC based monitoring system to check device status and to send manual or pre-programmed commands to one or more components of the network.

== Convergence with other standards ==
The Konnex KNX (standard) was developed as a result of the convergence between EIB, BCi and EHSA.
