= Bristol Standard Asynchronous Protocol =

Bristol Standard Asynchronous/Synchronous Protocol (BSAP) is an industrial automation protocol developed by Bristol Babcock and managed by Emerson. It is a peer-to-peer protocol suited to both synchronous high speed local networks and asynchronous low speed wide area networks. BSAP offers high message security for communication over telephone lines and radio networks by using effective error checking method (16 bit CRC-CCITT) and constantly exchanging the communication statistics. The polling scheme used by BSAP makes sure that each node in the network has an equal priority for requests and responses. BSAP also provides a mechanism of global addressing of all nodes connected for special messages like time synchronization apart from the normal individual addressing schemes. BSAP supports remote database access methods for reading and writing the memory in groups. It also supports multiple messaging schemes in which each node can transfer the node to other networks transparently and can transmit the responses in similar manner.

== Protocol layers ==
The protocol supports different layers including application, transport, network, link and physical with 1745 asynchronous character oriented messages, 2111 transparent messages and 2629 conversational mode messages. The physical layer support includes the following options.

- RS-232
- RS-485
- Leased phone line
- Satellite
- Ethernet
- Cellular

== See also ==
- Computer network
- Computer science
- Computing
