= GE Automation & Controls =

American industrial control systems company

- Type: Private (subsidiary of Emerson Electric)
- Industry: Industrial Automation and Controls
- Founded: Charlottesville, Virginia (1987)
- Headquarters: Charlottesville, Virginia, USA
- Area served: Worldwide
- Key people: Jeff Householder, President
- Products: Industrial automation hardware, software and embedded computing platforms
- Parent: Emerson Electric
- Website: www.emerson.com/industrial-automation-controls/

General Electric Automation and Controls combines what was formerly known as GE Intelligent Platforms and Alstom's Power Automation and Controls. In 2019, GE Intelligent Platforms was acquired by Emerson Electric and is now part of Emerson's Discrete Automation business unit.

GE Automation and Controls produce Programmable Logic Controller (PLC) and Programmable Automation Controller (PAC) based control systems, I/O, and field devices, including support to design, commission and operate industrial assets and operations. Industries served include manufacturing, food and beverage, life sciences, power, oil and gas, mining and metals, water and wastewater, and specialty machinery industries.

== History ==
In 1986, GE Fanuc Automation Corporation was jointly established in the US by FANUC and General Electric (GE). Under the joint venture company, three operating companies, GE Fanuc Automation North America, Inc., in the U.S., GE Fanuc Automation Europe S.A. in Luxembourg, and Fanuc GE Automation Asia Ltd. in Japan were established (the Asian company was established in 1987).

In 2007, the company was renamed to GE Fanuc Intelligent Platforms (and GE Fanuc Automation Solutions Europe SA became GE Fanuc Intelligent Platforms Europe SA). GE Fanuc Automation CNC Europe changed its name to Fanuc GE CNC Europe.

In 2009, GE and Fanuc agreed to dissolve their joint venture, and its software, controls and embedded business became part of GE under the new name GE Intelligent Platforms.

In 2015, GE Intelligent Platforms, Inc. changed its name to Automation & Controls upon acquisition of Alstom's Power Automation & Controls business.

In 2018, amidst restructuring plans for the whole General Electric group, it was announced that Emerson Electric was to acquire Intelligent Platforms, and the deal was completed on February 1, 2019.

=== Acquisitions ===
- 1998: Completed acquisition of AFE Technologies (first purchased 70% in late 1996)
- 1998: Acquired Total Control Products
- 2000: Acquired DataViews Corp
- 2001: Acquired VMIC
- 2002: Acquired Intellution, Inc.
- 2003: Acquired RAMiX
- 2003: Acquired Mountain Systems, Inc.
- 2006: Acquired (technology assets of) Condor Engineering
- 2006: Acquired SBS Technologies
- 2006: Acquired Radstone Technology PLC
- 2008: Acquired process technology assets from MTL Instruments Group
- 2011: Acquired SmartSignal, Inc
- 2011: Acquired technology assets of CSense Systems (Pty) Ltd.
- 2015: Acquired Alstom Power Automation & Controls
- 2015: Sold its embedded systems division to Veritas Capital, now known as Abaco Systems
- 2019: Acquired by Emerson Electric
