= ODVA (company) =

American global trade and standard development organization

ODVA, Inc. (formerly Open DeviceNet Vendors Association, Inc.) was founded in 1995 and is a global trade and standard development organization whose members are suppliers of devices for industrial automation applications. To qualify for membership in ODVA, applicants must be an entity that makes and sells products using ODVA technologies.

ODVA technologies include the Common Industrial Protocol or "CIP" - ODVA's media-independent, object-oriented protocol - along with ODVA's network adaptations of CIP - EtherNet/IP, DeviceNet, ControlNet, and CompoNet. ODVA has more than 15 technical working groups, overseen by its Technical Review Board, which develop and enhance ODVA's implementation specifications for its technologies. These specifications define how a product shall be designed in accordance with the specifications. ODVA maintains a conformance testing practice to validate that products designed using ODVA technologies comply with the specifications and interoperate in multivendor systems. ODVA also provides other services to its members to promote the adoption of ODVA technologies by industry.

ODVA is a US 501(c)6 corporation incorporated in the state of Wisconsin. Its headquarters are in Ann Arbor, Michigan U.S. It also has conformance test service providers in North America, China, Germany, and Japan.
