= EtherNet/IP =

Industrial network protocol

EtherNet/IP (IP = Industrial Protocol) is an industrial network protocol that adapts the Common Industrial Protocol (CIP) to standard Ethernet. EtherNet/IP is one of the leading industrial protocols in the United States and is widely used in a range of industries including factory, hybrid and process. The EtherNet/IP and CIP technologies are managed by ODVA, Inc., a global trade and standards development organization founded in 1995 with over 300 corporate members.

EtherNet/IP uses Ethernet as its data link and physical layer, the Internet Protocol as its network layer, and TCP and UDP as its transport layer. EtherNet/IP performs at the session layer and above (layers 5, 6 and 7) of the OSI model. CIP uses its object-oriented design to provide EtherNet/IP with the services and device profiles needed for real-time control applications and to promote consistent implementation of automation functions across a diverse ecosystem of products. In addition, EtherNet/IP adapts key elements of the Internet Protocol suite to the CIP object model framework; for example, it uses UDP to transport I/O messages.

Ethernet/IP was estimated to have about 30% share of the industrial Ethernet market in 2010 and 2018.

== History ==
Development of EtherNet/IP began in the 1990s within a technical working group of ControlNet International, Ltd.(CI), another trade and standards development organization. In 2000, ODVA and CI formed a joint technology agreement (JTA) for the development of EtherNet/IP. In 2009, the JTA was terminated and EtherNet/IP became under the sole control of ODVA and its members. Today, EtherNet/IP is one of four networks that adapt CIP to an industrial network along with DeviceNet, ControlNet and CompoNet. All of these networks are managed by ODVA, Inc.

== Technical detail ==
EtherNet/IP classifies Ethernet nodes into predefined device types with specific behaviors. Among other things, this enables:

- Transfer of basic I/O data via UDP-based implicit messaging
- Uploading and downloading of parameters, setpoints, programs and recipes via TCP (i.e., explicit messaging.)
- Polled, cyclic and change-of-state monitoring via UDP.
- One-to-one (unicast), one-to-many (multicast), and one-to-all (broadcast) communication via IP.
- EtherNet/IP makes use of TCP port number 44818 for explicit messaging and UDP port number 2222 for implicit messaging

== Open-source implementation ==
A portable open-source implementation named OpENer was started in 2009. The source code is available on GitHub, under an adapted BSD license.

An open-source C++ scanner library named EIPScanner is available on GitHub, under an MIT license.
