= Factory Instrumentation Protocol =

Field Bus Protocol

The Factory Instrumentation Protocol or FIP is a standardized field bus protocol. Its most current definition can be found in the European Standard EN50170.

== History ==
The FIP standard is based on a French initiative in 1982 to create a requirements analysis for a future field bus standard. The study led to the European Eureka initiative for a field bus standard in June 1986 that included 13 partners. The development group (réseaux locaux industriels) created the first proposal to be standardized in France. The name of the FIP field bus was originally given as an abbreviation of the French "Flux d'Information vers le Processus" while later referring to FIP with the English name "Factory Instrumentation Protocol" (some references also use the hybrid "Flux Information Protocol").

Based on the requirements study other manufacturers created similar protocol definitions - starting in 1990 a number of partners from Japan and America merged with FIP to the WorldFIP standardization group (that later merged into the Fieldbus Foundation group). Along with the competing German Profibus the field buses were submitted for European standardization by CENELEC in 1996. Along with other field bus standards these CENELEC standards were included to the international IEC 61158 and IEC 61784 standards by 1999 where FIP is listed as the Communication Profile Family 5. Eventually FIP has lost ground to Profibus which came to prevail the market in Europe in the following decade - the WorldFIP homepage has seen no press release since 2002 (with the US based Fieldbus Foundation to haven taken the lead in ongoing development which however promotes H1 fieldbus for process automation).

The closest cousin of the FIP family can be found today in the Wire Train Bus for train coaches. However a specific subset of WorldFIP - known the FIPIO protocol - can be found widely in machine components.

== Technology ==
There are three transmission speeds specified as 31.25 kbit/s, 1 Mbit/s and 2.5 Mbit/s for cable and optical fibre. There may be 255 stations per segment with an overall address range of 65536 communication ports. The messaging protocol uses synchronized access to the channel with messages of 128 bytes length.
