= Hitachi Rail Italy =

Multinational rolling stock manufacturer

- Formerly: AnsaldoBreda (2001–2015)
- Type: Società per Azioni (S.p.A.)
- Industry: Engineering
- Predecessor: Gio. Ansaldo & C. and Società Italiana Ernesto Breda
- Founded: 2001
- Fate: Merged with Hitachi Rail STS
- Successor: Hitachi Rail STS
- Headquarters: Naples, Italy
- Area served: Worldwide
- Key people: Maurizio Manfellotto (President & CEO)
- Products: Rail transport vehicles
- Services: Maintenance
- Number of employees: 2,400
- Parent: Hitachi Rail (2015–2021); Finmeccanica (2001–2015)
- Subsidiaries: Hitachi Rail USA
- Website: hitachirail.com

Hitachi Rail Italy S.p.A. was a multinational rolling stock manufacturer company based in Pistoia, Italy. Formerly AnsaldoBreda S.p.A., a subsidiary of state-owned Finmeccanica, the company was sold in 2015 to Hitachi Rail of Japan. After the deal was finalized, the new name was adopted in November 2015 to reflect the new ownership.

As of April 1, 2021, the company was merged into Hitachi Rail STS.

== History ==
=== Early history: Ansaldo and Breda ===
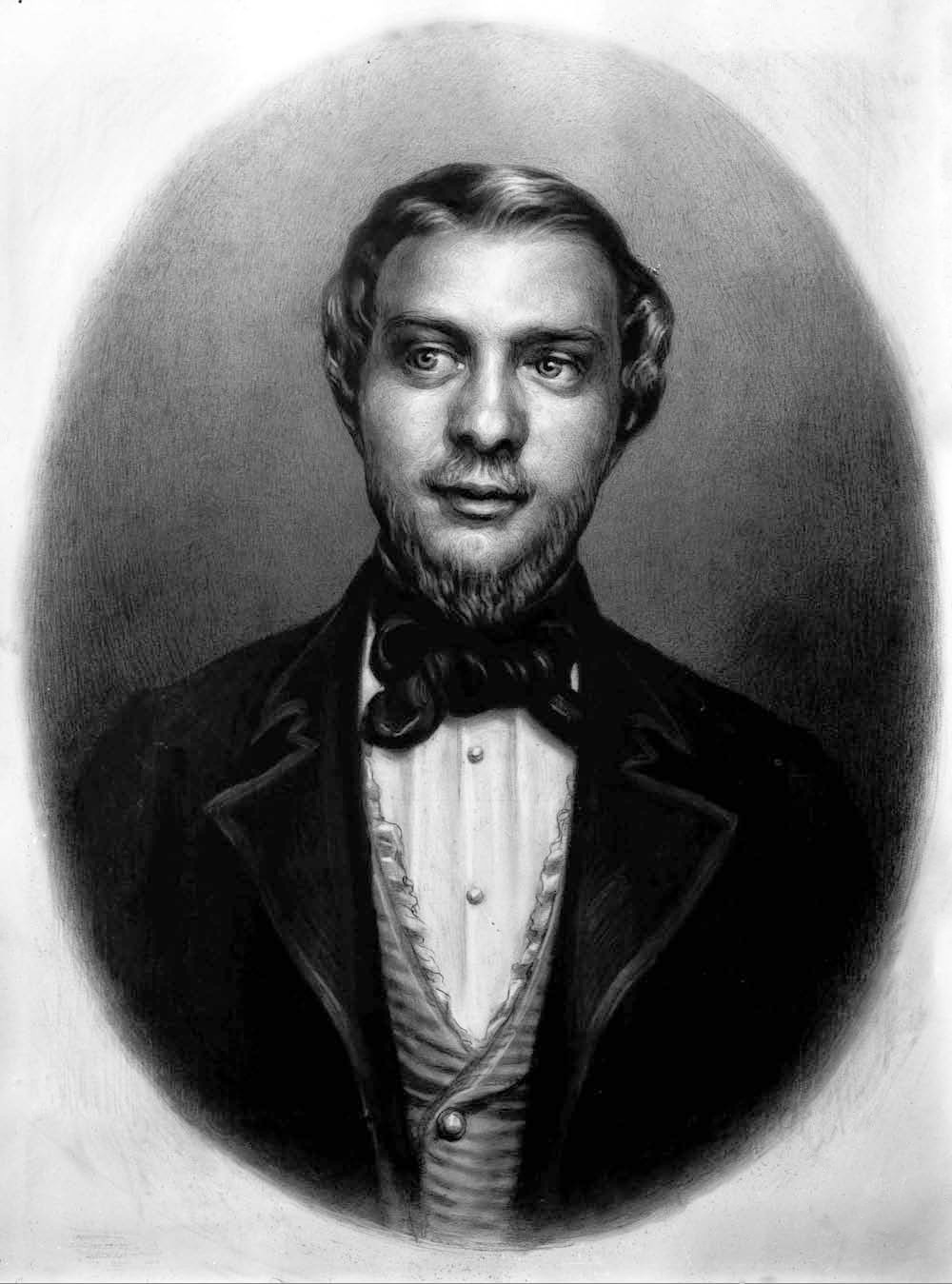
Giovanni Ansaldo founded the company in 1853.

==== Ansaldo ====
In 1853, the company Gio. Ansaldo & C. was registered in Genoa as a manufacturer of steam locomotives, rail rolling stock and steam engines. The company was backed by Camillo Benso, Count of Cavour, the powerful finance minister of Piedmont-Sardinia, who aimed to reduce its dependence on imported trains and rolling stock. Ansaldo entered the age of the steam locomotive in 1854 with its model FS113, also known as Sampierdarena. During the First World War, Ansaldo became a large supplier of weapons to the Italian army; facing insurmountable difficulties with post-war reconversion to civilian industry, the company was eventually nationalised in 1921. During the rest of the 1900s, the company diversified in different fields, especially power generation (Ansaldo Energia) and nuclear research, while the rolling stock activities were reunited under Ansaldo Trasporti.

==== Breda ====
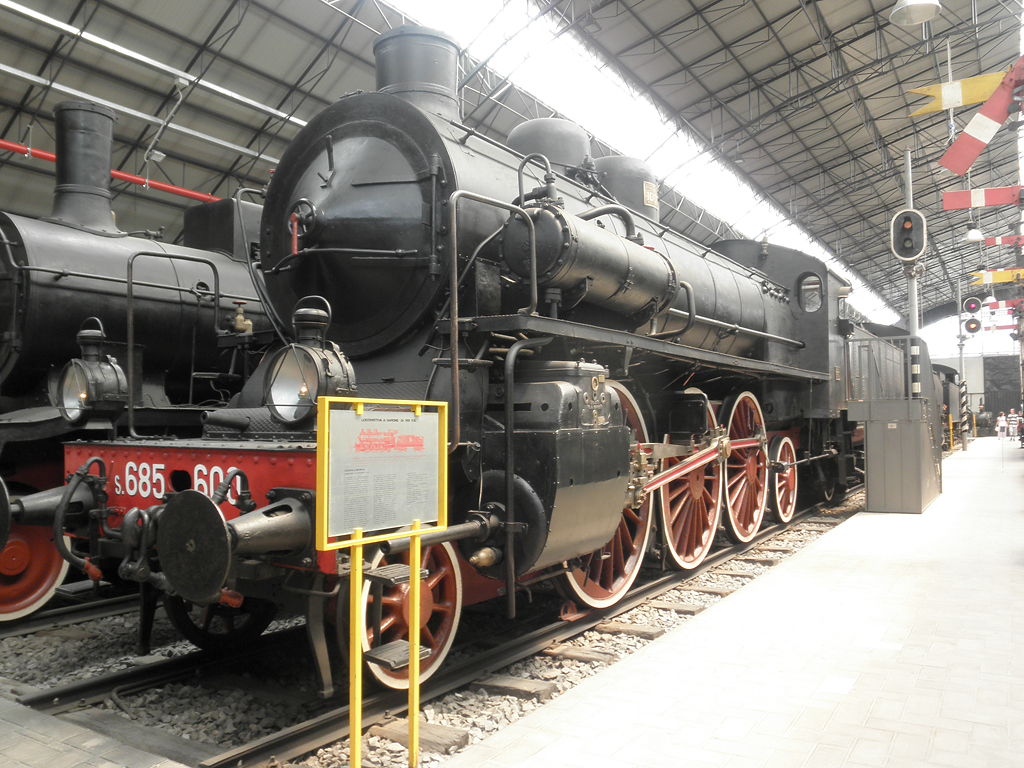
Breda thousandth locomotive, the FS 685.600, at the Leonardo da Vinci Museum in Milan.

In 1886, Ernesto Breda founded in Milan Società Italiana Ernesto Breda. By 1908, Breda's thousandth locomotive was built. Breda entered the electric locomotive era in 1936 with the production of the FS Class ETR 200 series electric multiple unit. In 1939 this type set the land speed record for rail vehicles at 203 km/h (126 mph). Similarly to Ansaldo, also Breda became a main weapon supplier to the Fascist regime, especially of artillery and airplanes. After the Second World War the company was facing bankruptcy, and was eventually nationalised in 1947. During the Italian economic miracle of the 1950-60s, Breda produced a highly successful commuter train, the FS Class ETR 300, several classes of railcars and locomotives, and diversified into defense (OTO Melara) and, especially, buses. In the 1980s Breda participated in the consortium that designed the first Italian high-speed train, the FS Class ETR 500.

=== Merger and crisis (2001–2015) ===
AnsaldoBreda logo, 2001–2015.

In a massive restructuring effort, in 2001 the Italian state merged all the rolling stock activities of the then loss-making Ansaldo and Breda in a new company, AnsaldoBreda, that in turn became part of the Finmeccanica state-owned group. The new company won a string of big contracts across Europe and the United States; however, lacking adequate funding and capacity, AnsaldoBreda became infamous for its unreliable products and long delays, damaging the reputation of the company.

==== Controversies during the 2000s ====
In 1991, 100 4000 Series railcars from AnsaldoBreda were delivered to the Washington Metropolitan Area Transit Authority. On 4 July 2010, after several incidents where the doors would open while the train was in motion, Metro removed the fleet for repairs until 20 July that year. On 17 November 2016 Metro discovered an error in which a 4000-series car would display an incorrect speed limit to a train operator while in manual mode (which is the only mode used since the June 2009 Washington Metro train collision). On 7 June 2017 Metro announced that the 4000-series cars would be fully retired and removed from service on 1 July 2017, and by that date all cars were taken out of service.

Delivery of 83 IC4 AnsaldoBreda trainsets for the Danish State Railways DSB was originally planned for 2003–2006. However, the last train was delivered only in 2013 and IC4 trains have seen many technical problems during their service. DSB announced in 2016 that the trains would be withdrawn from service from 2024.

After winning a big contract for the Dutch-Belgium Fyra project in 2004, nine V250 train units were delivered to the Dutch partner NS over five years later than originally contracted. Soon after the trains went into service on the high-speed line between the Netherlands and Belgium, the V250 suffered a number of severe technical problems. The Fyra had a poor reputation for reliability. After a month of operations more than 5% of all trains were cancelled and less than 45% of them ran on schedule. On 31 May 2013, the Belgium partner NMBS/SNCB announced that they would exit the Fyra project and cancel the contract with AnsaldoBreda.

The City of Gothenburg in Sweden has ordered 40 one-directional Sirio trams which were to be put into service on the Gothenburg tram network during 2005 and onwards. The trams were delivered late and functioned poorly when put into traffic. Among reported problems were corrosion, excessive track damage caused by the trams, malfunctioning air conditioners inside the trams and poor ride quality. The City of Gothenburg therefore withheld a large part of the payment for a delivered tram until fully operational.

The 32 two-directional trams delivered for the Oslo Tramway from 1999, called SL95, have met several difficulties with rust during snowy weather and the heavy weight necessitates much maintenance to streets and tracks, which make the trams expensive to operate. They are also considered to create more noise than necessary. The replacement of the trams will start in 2020 and the last trams will be taken out of service in 2024.

After 7 years on a 4-year project the region of Stockholm decided to cancel the contract on new signal system for the red metro line in Stockholm with Ansaldo on 1 billion SEK. The prepayment of hundreds of million SEK is currently up in arbitration court.

The maintenance issues experienced by MBTA AnsaldoBreda Type 8 Vehicles delayed the retirement of the Boeing LRVs by several years. According to MBTA Chief Operating Officer Jeff Gonneville, they present a "maintenance challenge". In October 2016, the Boston Globe reported that the MBTA Green Line had the most derailments in the nation due to the Type 8.

==== The Italian high-speed trains program ====
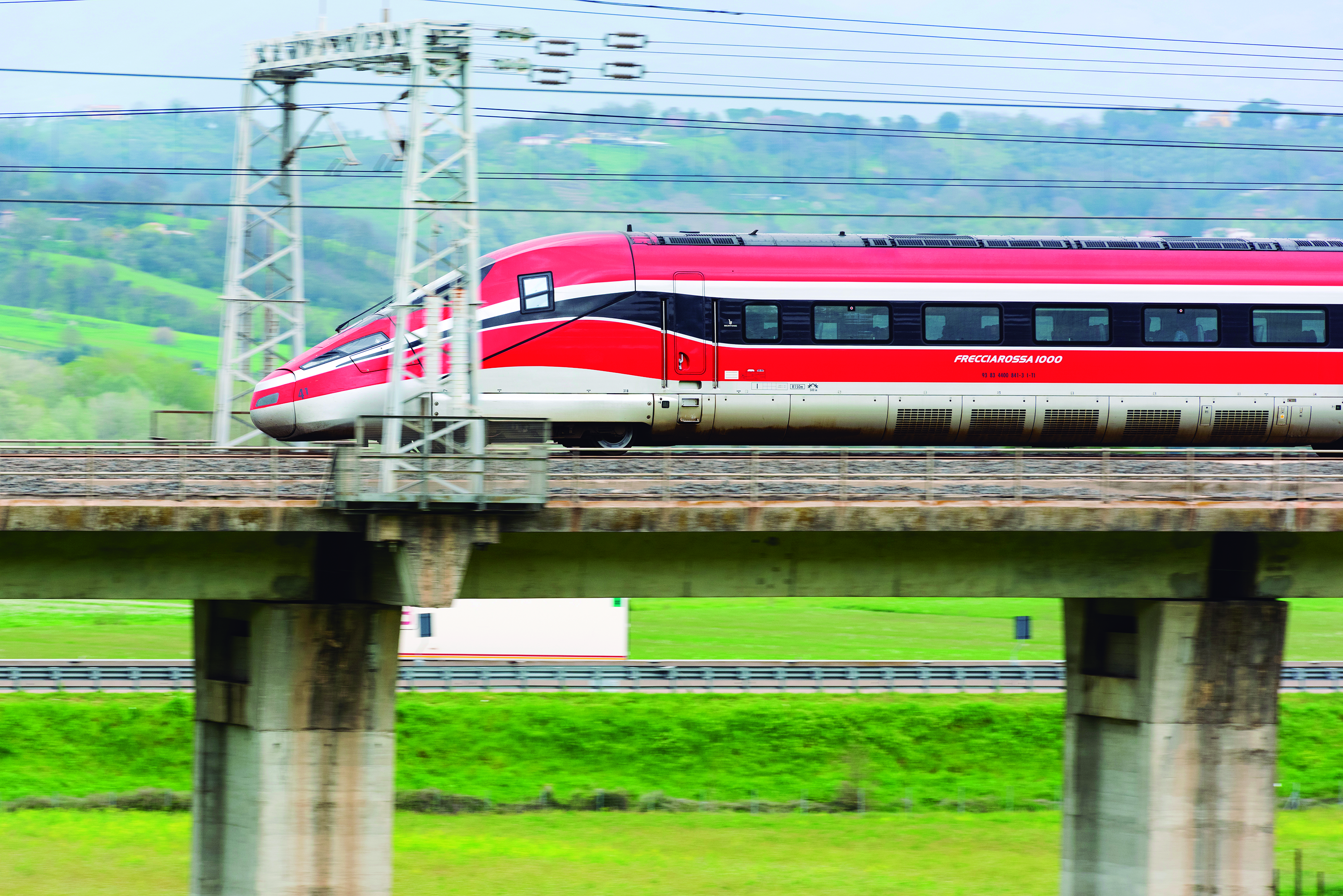
A Frecciarossa 1000.

In spite of its overall terminal crisis, AnsaldoBreda managed to successfully participate in the Italian high-speed trains program until the very end of its existence. The ETR 500, that entered service in 1993, was continuously upgraded and ran at a record speed of 362 km/h (225 mph) in the Monte Bibele tunnel between Florence and Bologna in 2009, setting a speed record for trains in a tunnel. A new generation high-speed train, the Frecciarossa 1000, was developed in a consortium with Bombardier Transportation and entered service in 2015. On 26 February 2016, a Frecciarossa 1000 reportedly attained a peak speed of 393.8 km/h (244.7 mph) while traversing the Torino-Milano high speed line.

=== Hitachi Italy era (2015 to present) ===
Lacking the funds for a proper restructuring of its troubled subsidiary, Finmeccanica announced on 2 November 2015 the 'closing of transactions' covering the purchase of AnsaldoBreda by Hitachi, together with Finmeccanica's 40% stake in Ansaldo STS, for $2.2 billion.

Under the agreements signed on 24 February 2015, following a dividend distribution announced on 6 March, the purchase price for Finmeccanica's stake in Ansaldo STS has been set at €9.50 per share, amounting to a total of €761m. The total net consideration to be paid for AnsaldoBreda as a going concern, including property assets, amounts to around €30m. As a part of the deal Finmeccanica would keep the responsibility for some residual contracts.

Since being acquired by Hitachi, production of some British Rail Class 802 was shifted to Hitachi Rail Italy's Pistoia plant due to Hitachi Rail's Newton Aycliffe plant being at capacity.

== Products ==
=== DMU and EMU ===
- Frecciarossa 1000
- FS Class ALe 642
- FS Class ETR 500
- IC4
- NSB Class 72
- Rock
- Treno ad alta frequentazione
- Treno Servizio Regionale
- V250

=== Metro ===
- AnsaldoBreda Meneghino
- AnsaldoBreda Leonardo
- Hitachi Rail Italy Driverless Metro

(All of these metros are being used in the Milan Metro network as of 2023.)

=== Tram and light rail ===
- AnsaldoBreda P2550
- AnsaldoBreda T-68/T-68A
- AnsaldoBreda T-69
- Breda LRV of the San Francisco Muni Metro
- Sirio
- SL95

=== Locomotives ===
- FS Class E.402
- FS Class E.403

== Main operators ==
=== Brazil ===
- Elettrotreno ETR 211 (Metrostar) for Fortaleza Metro running in the Linha Sul

=== China ===
- Sirio for Zhuhai Tram

=== Denmark ===
- Hitachi Rail Italy Driverless Metro for Copenhagen Metro.
- diesel multiple unit IC4 for DSB

=== Greece ===
- Sirio for Athens Tram.
- 33 Hitachi Rail Italy Driverless Metro for Metro Thessaloniki.

=== Italy ===
- high-speed ETR 500 for Trenitalia of Ferrovie dello Stato Italiane.
- high-speed Frecciarossa 1000 for Trenitalia of Ferrovie dello Stato Italiane.
- locomotive E.402
- locomotive E.403
- multiple unit Treno Servizio Regionale (TSR) for LeNORD.
- multiple unit Treno ad alta frequentazione (TAF) for Ferrovie Nord Milano (FNM).
- multiple unit Caravaggio for Trenitalia and FNM.
- three-car articulated units ETR 211 Metrostar for Circumvesuviana. The Circumvesuviana operate a fleet of twenty-six "Metrostar".
- Meneghino for Milan Metro.
- Leonardo for Milan Metro.
- Hitachi Rail Italy Driverless Metro for Milan Metro and Brescia Metro.
- Sirio for Tramvie Elettriche Bergamasche of Bergamo.
- Sirio for Rete tranviaria di Firenze of Florence.
- Sirio for Naples tramway network of Naples and for Sassari metro-tramway.

=== Morocco ===
- multiple unit TAF Z2M for ONCF. The ONCF operates a fleet of 24 trains.

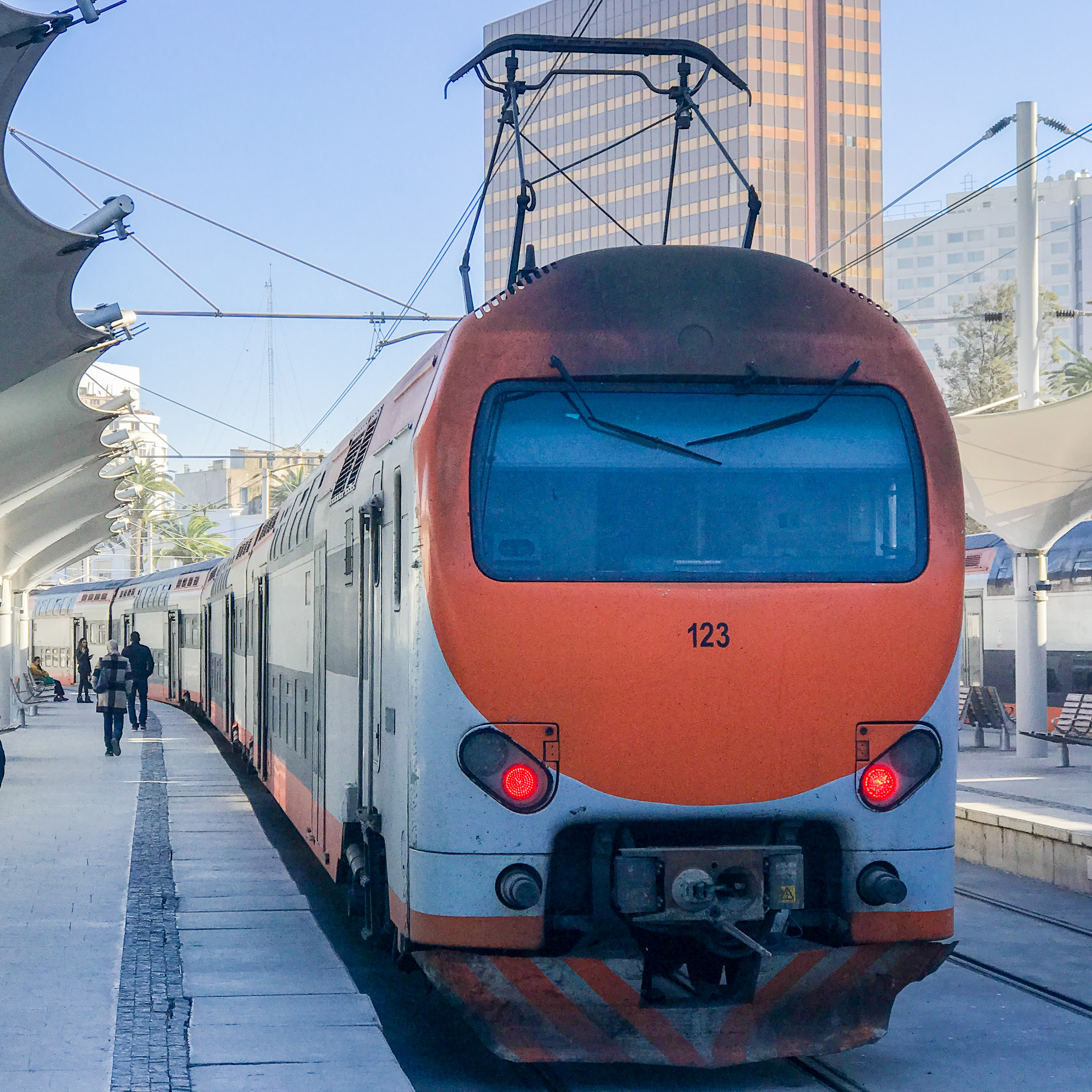
ONCF TAF Z2M

=== Norway ===
- electric multiple unit NSB Class 72 for Norwegian State Railways. The NSB operates a fleet of 36 trains.
- multiple unit SL95 for Oslo Tramway. Sporveien Trikken operates a fleet of 32 low-floor, articulated trams. Over the years, AnsaldoBreda has updated the equipment to meet the requirements and demands of the operator in Norway.

=== Spain ===
- multiple unit AnsaldoBreda series S7000 operates mainly on the Line 10 (Madrid Metro) Madrid Metro. The Madrid Metro operates a fleet of 37 trains.
- multiple unit AnsaldoBreda series S9000 for the Line 7 (Madrid Metro) Madrid Metro. The Madrid Metro operates a fleet of 53 trains.

=== Sweden ===
- Sirio trams for Gothenburg tram network of Gothenburg.

=== Turkey ===
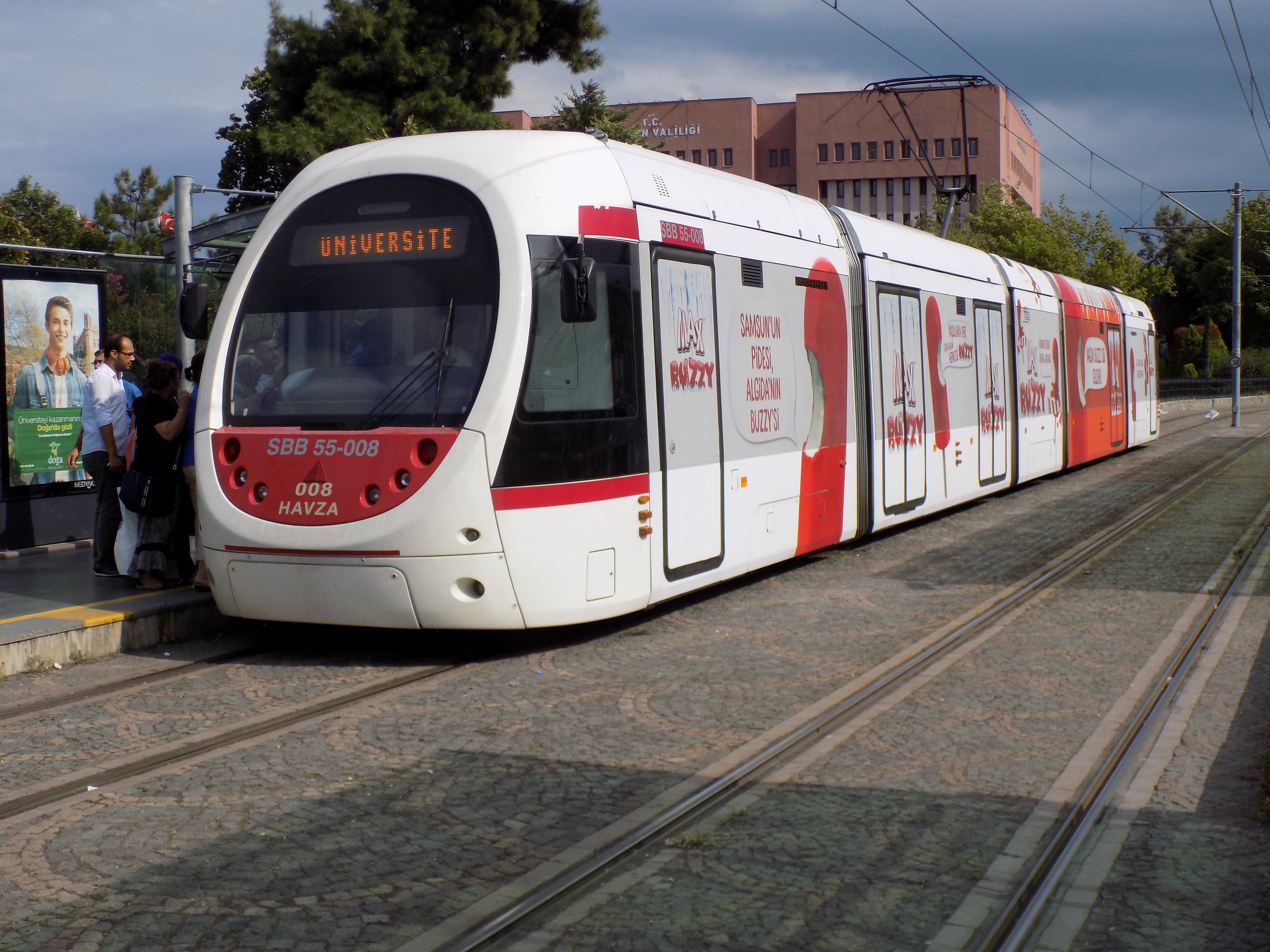
AnsaldoBreda Sirio in Samsun

- 38 Sirio trams for Kayseray (Kayseri Light Rail System).
- Sirio for Samsun Tram.
- AnsaldoBreda LRT (B96) for Ankaray

=== United Kingdom ===
- Midland Metro formerly operated a fleet of 16 two carriage T69 trams in Birmingham. The fleet was completely replaced after 14 years of service by CAF Urbos 3 trams in 2015.
- Manchester Metrolink commenced operations in 1992 using a passenger fleet of 26 T-68 trams, with a further 6 (slightly modified) versions supplied by 2000. The entire fleet was gradually replaced by july 2014.
- Great Western Railway ordered 36 train sets of British Rail Class 802 which were produced in HRI's Pistoia facility.

=== United States ===
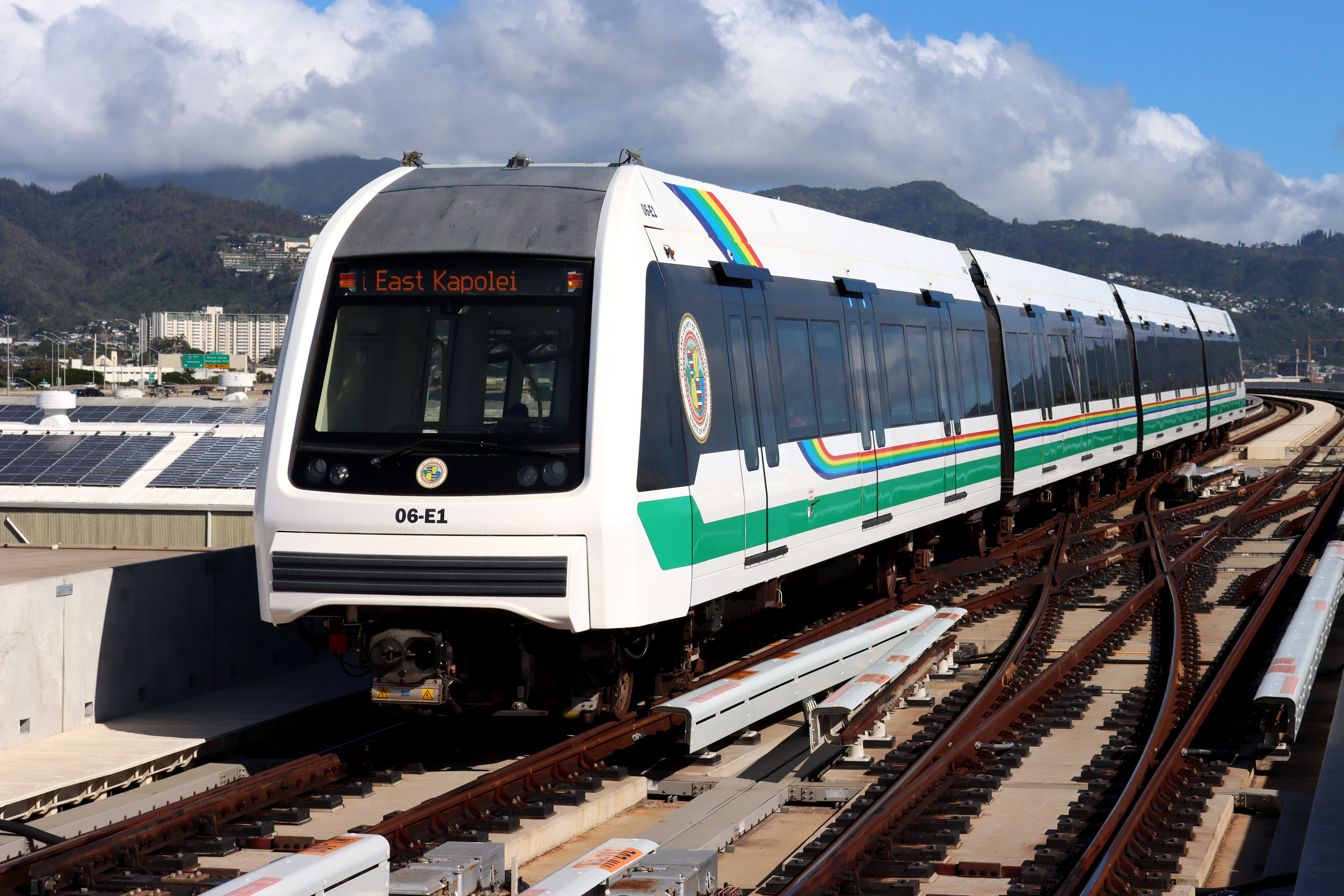
Driverless trainset operated by Honolulu Skyline

- multiple unit Breda CQ312 class for the Metropolitan Atlanta Rapid Transit Authority. The Metropolitan Atlanta Rapid Transit Authority operates a fleet of 100 cars, car numbers 601–702, built by Breda, 2001–2005.
- multiple unit AnsaldoBreda Type 8 LRV for the MBTA's Green Line in Boston. The Massachusetts Bay Transportation Authority operates a fleet of 95 LRV cars, alongside the MBTA's existing Kinki Sharyo type 7 cars. The Breda cars have been very difficult to maintain and are expected to be outlasted by their predecessors (built by Kinki Sharyo)
- multiple unit Breda LRV for the Blue and Green lines of Cleveland. The RTA Rapid Transit operates a fleet of 48 LRV cars.
- multiple unit AnsaldoBreda P2550 for the Los Angeles Metro A Line. The Los Angeles County Metropolitan Transportation Authority operates a fleet of 50 LRV cars.
- multiple unit AnsaldoBreda A650 Breda A650. The Los Angeles County Metropolitan Transportation Authority operates a fleet of 72 vehicles on the B Line and D Line.
- multiple unit AnsaldoBreda LRV2 and AnsaldoBreda LRV3 for the Muni Metro of San Francisco Municipal Railway. The Muni Metro operated a fleet of 151 LRV cars.
- multiple units for the Washington Metro. The Washington Metropolitan Area Transit Authority operates:
  - 1000-Series—300 units originally built by Rohr, Inc., 290 units were refurbished by Breda; retired in 2017
  - 2000-Series—76 units built, refurbished by Alstom 2002-2004, retired in 2024.
  - 3000-Series—290 units built, refurbished by Alstom 2004-2009.
  - 4000-Series—100 units built; retired in 2017
  - 8000-Series-256 units currently on order, delivery starting in 2027
- 136 cars for Metrorail (Miami-Dade County) - assembled in Medley by HRI subsidiary Hitachi Rail USA
- 78 cars for Baltimore Metro SubwayLink-Also assembled in Miami by Hitachi Rail USA (production has since shifted to Hagerstown, MD)
- 80 cars for Skyline in Honolulu, Hawaii

== See also ==
- Ansaldo
- Breda
- Leonardo
