= Ethernet consist network =

Ethernet Consist Network (ECN) is a train communication network based on Ethernet technology standardised with IEC 61375-3-4. This is a vehicle (consist) communication like Multifunction Vehicle Bus (MVB) in train communication network (TCN).

ECN provides an Internet Protocol (IP) interface to TCMS (train control and management system) and other systems within a vehicle (consist). The Ethernet technology's large bandwidth (typically 100 Mbit/s) is particularly suitable for data-intensive systems like video surveillance or passenger information systems.

== See also ==
- Ethernet Train Backbone (ETB)
