= Ethernet train backbone =

An Ethernet train backbone (ETB) is a train communication network based on Ethernet technology standardised with IEC-61375-2-5. This is a train-wide communication backbone such as Wire Train Bus (WTB).

== See also ==
- Ethernet consist network (ECN)
