= IC4 =

Danish diesel inter-city train

DSB Class MG
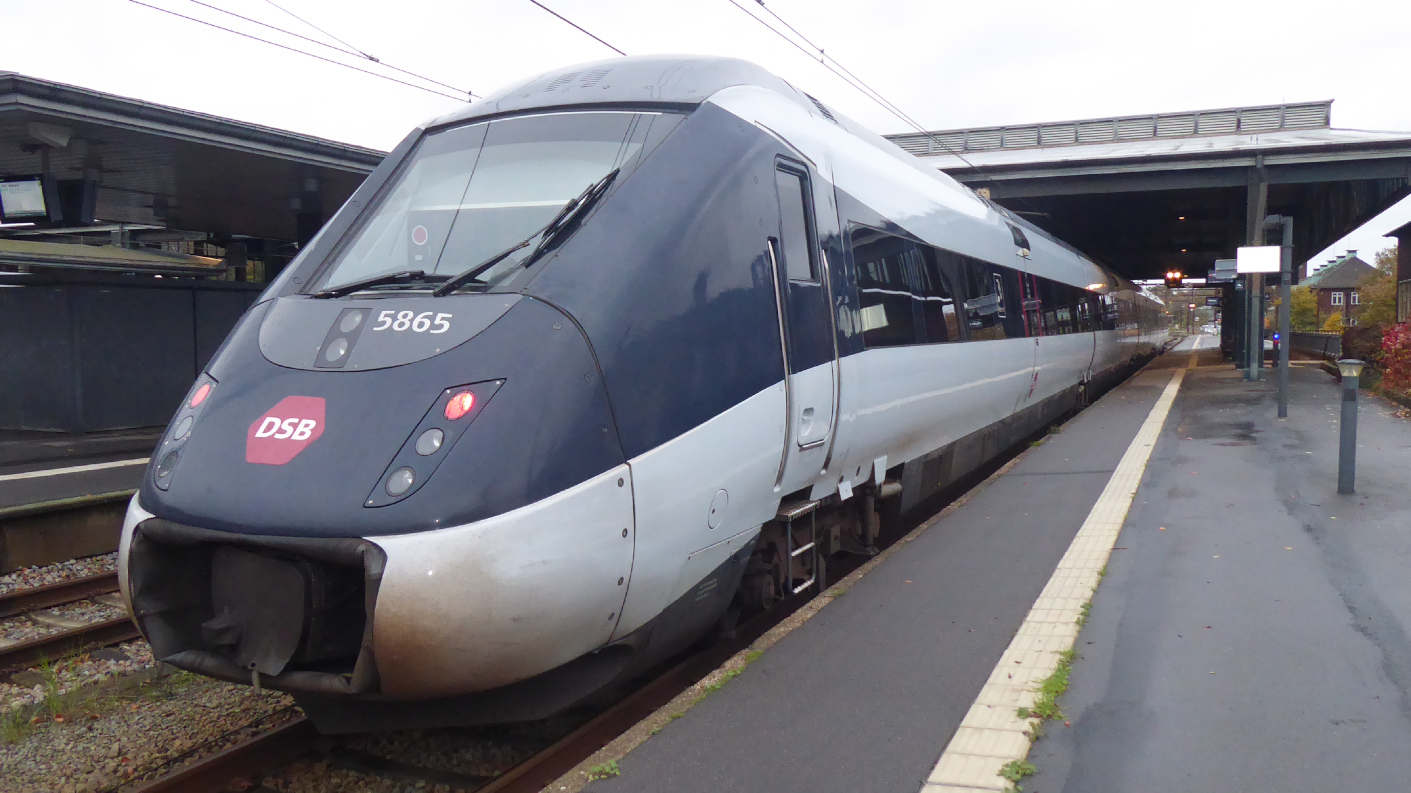
- IC4 unit MG 5865 in 2021
- In service: 2007–2011, 2012–present
- Manufacturer: AnsaldoBreda
- Built at: Pistoia, Reggio Calabria, Naples and Randers
- Replaced: IC3, MR and DD
- Constructed: 2005–2013
- Entered service: 2007
- Number under construction: -
- Number built: 82
- Number in service: 74
- Formation: 4 vehicles per unit: MG-FH-FG-MG
- Fleet numbers: 5601–5683
- Capacity: 204 seated
- Operators: DSB; Astra Trans Carpatic
- Depot: Aarhus H
- Line served: Lindholm–Copenhagen Airport

Specifications
- Car body construction: Aluminium
- Train length: 86.53 m (283 ft 10 11/16 in)
- Car length: 19,000 mm (62 ft 4 1/16 in) (intermediate cars); 24,000 mm (78 ft 8 7/8 in) (end cars)
- Width: 3,150 mm (10 ft 4 in)
- Height: 4,200 mm (13 ft 9 3/8 in)
- Floor height: 1,290 mm (50 13/16 in) (MG and FG cars); 600 mm (23 5/8 in) (FH cars)
- Platform height: 550 mm (21 5/8 in)
- Entry: Step (MG and FG cars); Level (FH cars)
- Doors: 4
- Maximum speed: 180 km/h (in service); 200 km/h (designed)
- Weight: 160 tonnes (157.5 long tons; 176.4 short tons)
- Prime mover: 4 × Iveco V8s
- Engine type: 4 × 12 L (732 cu in) diesels
- Power output: 4 × 560 kW (750 hp)
- Transmission: Mechanical
- Acceleration: 0.9 m/s^{2} (3.0 ft/s^{2})
- HVAC: Air conditioner
- Braking systems: Air brake, dynamic brake and track brake
- Safety system: ATC (ZUB 123)
- Coupling system: Dellner automatic
- Track gauge: 1,435 mm (4 ft 8 1/2 in) standard gauge

The IC4 is an inter-city rail train built by the Italian train manufacturer AnsaldoBreda for the trans-Great Belt routes of Danske Statsbaner (DSB), Denmark's national railway operator. Under DSB's 'Good trains for everyone' plan ('Gode tog til alle'), the intent of the IC4 project was to replace several types of outdated rolling stock. However, various delays and shortcomings have turned the project into a major political issue.

The IC4 units were originally scheduled to enter DSB's Intercity service in 2003. On 25 June 2007, one IC4 unit (trainset no. 4) entered regional service between Aarhus and Aalborg. On 27 August 2007, another test train entered regional passenger service between Aarhus and Fredericia in eastern Jutland. Two further units entered regional service during the autumn of 2007. By the end of 2007, DSB and AnsaldoBreda were to agree when the IC4 would be ready for Intercity and IntercityLyn (express inter-city) services. This, however, required the approval of the Danish National Rail Authority.

The IC4's first long-distance run, from Aalborg to Copenhagen, took place on 7 August 2008, while the train finally received approval for regular service with multiple connected trainsets on 9 November 2010. The 82nd and final unit (MG 5683) was delivered to DSB in September 2013, and as of 2015, IC4 trains are in regular operation on the Aarhus-Copenhagen, Aarhus-Aalborg, Aarhus-Esbjerg, Odense-Fredericia and Copenhagen-Holbæk-Kalundborg connections.

== Equipment and specifications ==
The train is powered by four low-emission diesel engines with a common rail direct-injection system, giving a total power output of 2,240 kW (3,004 bhp) (or 3045 metric hp). The engines are 20-litre (1,200-cubic-inch) V8s from Iveco. The maximum allowed speed of the train is 200 km/h (120 mph). Each train set consists of four articulated cars with a total length of 86 m (282 ft 2 in), and is capable of seating 204 people. Built of light aluminium alloys, each trainset weighs 140–160 tonnes (137.8–157.5 long tons; 154.3–176.4 short tons), and a fully operational (including diesel, water, etc.) weight of 170 tonnes (167.3 long tons; 187.4 short tons).

Up to four trainsets can be coupled together into a single train. However, there are problems associated with this configuration, so in the first instance it was decided to have the IC4 approved using one trainset only, with approval for multi-unit configurations to be sought later. Since a single trainset is too short for efficient long-distance operations, the first trains were used mainly for regional services. In December 2016, DSB gave up the efforts to connect four trainsets.

== Design ==
The design of the train is the outcome of cooperation between DSB's own designers, with an emphasis on Nordic minimalist design, and the Italian design company Pininfarina (famous for designing Ferrari cars) emphasizing Italian chic and curved lines. Externally, the bullet-shaped extremities at each end of the trainset—which are familiar from high-speed trains throughout Europe—represent a break with the design of the IC3 train, whose passengers are able to cross over between trainsets. The train interior features natural materials consistent with Scandinavia's design tradition, an audio/video information system with seat reservation displays, and a lounge area.

== Controversy ==
The IC4 train has become a contentious issue in Danish politics, mainly because of the long delays in AnsaldoBreda’s delivery of the trains. The Danish Minister of Traffic and Energy is routinely required to submit progress updates to parliament, and DSB's choice of a heavily customised train is often criticised as being the major reason for the delays. The expense involved in lengthening the platforms of several stations along the IC4 routes is the source of much additional criticism. In November 2006, it was revealed that the trains appeared to be working properly, but that the formal documentation requirements of the safety authorities were preventing the train from entering service fully. By the end of October 2007, four IC4 units had entered regional service in Jutland. However, service was suspended at the end of February 2008 because of problems with exhaust fumes. There have been many faults that did not really prevent the train from being used, but were still unacceptable, such as spurious warnings and various other computer-related problems.

== Ultimatum ==
In June 2008, DSB gave AnsaldoBreda an ultimatum whereby at least 14 trains had to be approved and ready for regular service before May 2009; otherwise, the contract would be cancelled and DSB would demand its money back and return its trains to the factory. DSB had ordered a total of 83 IC4 trainsets in 2000, with delivery originally scheduled for 2003.

On 7 August 2008, train no. 13 completed a return trip from Aarhus H. to Copenhagen H. with passengers aboard. On 21 May 2009, it became clear that the ultimatum had been met, with 15 trains having been delivered, although a subclause condition stating that at least one trainset should have been tested and approved for coupling to other units had not yet been met.

== Current situation ==
Along with the (partial) fulfilment of the ultimatum, DSB also announced it had reached an agreement with AnsaldoBreda concerning delivery of the remaining trainsets. The final delivery date would be extended to 2012. AnsaldoBreda would drop all further development, and all subsequent trainsets would be identical to the current test train. All final updates would be performed by DSB. AnsaldoBreda was to pay DSB compensation of DKK 2 billion, which, together with the previously paid compensation fees, will ultimately entail refunding half the original value of the contract. DSB reserved the right to cancel the contract if more than seven trains were delivered over six months late.

DSB is suffering from a shortage of trainsets and reliability problems with the current trainsets, since the existing IC3s are old and require replacement. Ordering new IC3s would be 'expensive and technically challenging', according to DSB. DSB, in cooperation with Deutsche Bahn, has started using German tilting ICE-TD diesel trains to and from Germany. This has relieved the situation somewhat, despite the high cost of these trains and the expense of adapting them for Danish traffic. In October 2008, DSB also ordered 45 new double-decker coaches from Bombardier, to be delivered from the end of 2009 onwards.

From August 2009, DSB was running 17 scheduled trains daily using the IC4. However, DSB was using only single IC4 sets, not multiple connected sets, limiting their utility. Therefore they could not be used during rush hours, as longer trains are needed at those times. On 9 November 2010, after a seven-year delay, DSB finally completed the certification process for multiple connected IC4 trainsets. These were scheduled to enter service in January 2011. At the end April 2011, DSB's director, Frank Olesen, stated that further economic sanctions against AnsaldoBreda were likely to be imposed as a result of continuing problems with the quality of the trains delivered. These problems had caused the trains to have to be upgraded to Danish standards at DSB's own expense at its facility in Randers. Eighteen IC4 trains had been approved for operation, nine of them then being in daily service.

In November 2011, two IC4 trains failed to stop at stop signals. This caused Trafikstyrelsen (the Transportation Authority) to prohibit the IC4 from running until the problems had been fully investigated.

On 2 July 2012, the DSB announced that the Transportation Authority had approved Denmark's railway operator to put back into operation the fleet of 37 IC4s which had been withdrawn from service in November 2011.

On 18 December 2012 an agreement was reached between AnsaldoBreda and Danish railways to solve the problems.

The 82nd and final unit (MG 5683) was delivered to DSB in September 2013.

As of 2014, IC4 trains are in regular operation between Aarhus and Copenhagen, Aarhus-Aalborg, Aarhus-Esbjerg and Copenhagen-Kalundborg. The two-car IC2 version is also in service on some regional services in Jutland, e.g., Kolding-Vejle. Concerns about reliability remain, however, especially after the failure of an IC4 trainset in the Great Belt tunnel on 24 February 2014 and the consequent evacuation of 191 passengers to another trainset.

In September 2014 an investigation by the Danish Department of Transport was launched to find whether it was more economical to have the delivered trains scrapped or have them rebuilt for slower regional traffic. Scrapping the trains could lead to DSB filing for bankruptcy.

It was announced on 15 December 2016 that the troubled fleet would be retained, but subject to a number of reliability improvements and with a view to withdrawal once a replacement fleet became available from 2024 onwards. In 2017, the Romanian rolling stock manufacturer Astra Vagoane Călători purchased 15 IC2 units from DSB, to use them for its own transport division, Astra Trans Carpatic.

On 2 January 2019 two units were damaged, at least one of them beyond repair, in the Great Belt Bridge rail accident.

By mid-2019 DSB's quarterly reports showed that the IC4 units had become significantly more reliable, achieving a mean distance between failures (MDBF) of 7,643 kilometres (4,749 mi) (with a failure being defined as one causing a delay of more than three minutes). This significantly exceeded the 3,000-kilometre (1,900 mi) target set in the December 2016 reliability recommendation, but nevertheless compared poorly to the 28,900-kilometre (18,000 mi) MDBF achieved by the older IC3 fleet at the same time. DSB's Operations Director Per Schrøder attributed the increase to a number of improvements and upgrades, including new train management system software, and to DSB's engineers having increased their level of familiarity with the fleet. Schrøder also stated that the overall reliability of the fleet had been improved by the withdrawing of a number of particularly problematic units, which he referred to as "Monday models" and "hangar queens". DSB's operations plan at the time called for 42 of the remaining units to be available for service at any given time, from which a maximum of 37 would be routinely allocated for use.

In July 2020 DSB offered 11 of the withdrawn "hangar queen" units for sale through a broker in England, describing them as being "in very good working order". DSB's Director of Strategy and Rolling Stock, Jürgen Müller, later clarified that the wording had been prepared by the broker, rather than by DSB. However, he also noted that all 11 units had been continuously maintained since being withdrawn, and that they were being sold because the increasing reliability of the main IC4 fleet had made them redundant. Indeed, reliability figures released in August 2020 indicated that the IC4 fleet had achieved its best-ever MDBF of approximately 12,000 kilometres (7,500 mi) – sufficient for the National Audit Office (Rigsrevisionen) to declare that it was satisfied that DSB had completed commissioning the fleet.

On 2 June 2022, Danish news magazine Ingeniøren published an article claiming that DSB has agreed to sell the entire fleet of 74 IC4 units – not just the 11 previously offered for sale – to an undisclosed foreign buyer. The sale is believed to involve an initial delivery of 14 units, with the remainder of the fleet to follow as it is phased out of operation with DSB. The exact timing will depend on the progress of DSB's order for the Alstom Coradia Stream electric multiple-unit trains that will replace the IC4 fleet; as of May 2022 the first of the new units is expected to enter service in mid-2025.

== Libyan trainset ==
In March 2013, as well as in earlier media reports, it was reported that one of the missing IC4 trainsets planned for delivery in Denmark had been found in Libya. Reportedly, AnsaldoBreda and the then Italian prime minister Silvio Berlusconi gave Libyan dictator Muammar Gaddafi the trainset as a present in 2009 on the occasion of the 40th anniversary of Gaddafi's accession to power. It is visible on Google Maps satellite (at 32.828791°N 13.111563°E) and geotagged photos. A DR film crew visited the site of the train in question in March 2013.

== Gallery ==
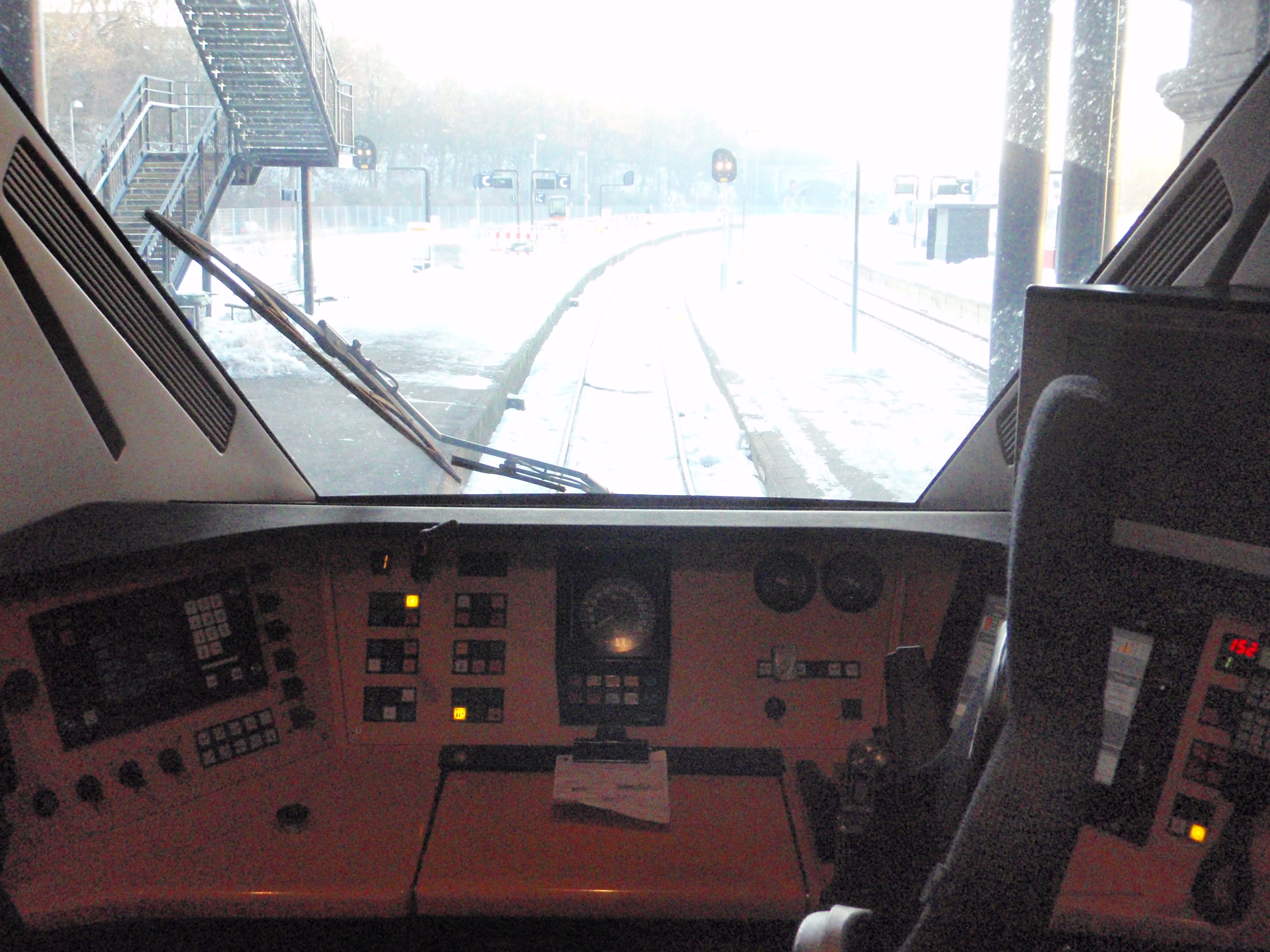
Cab view (unit 5632)

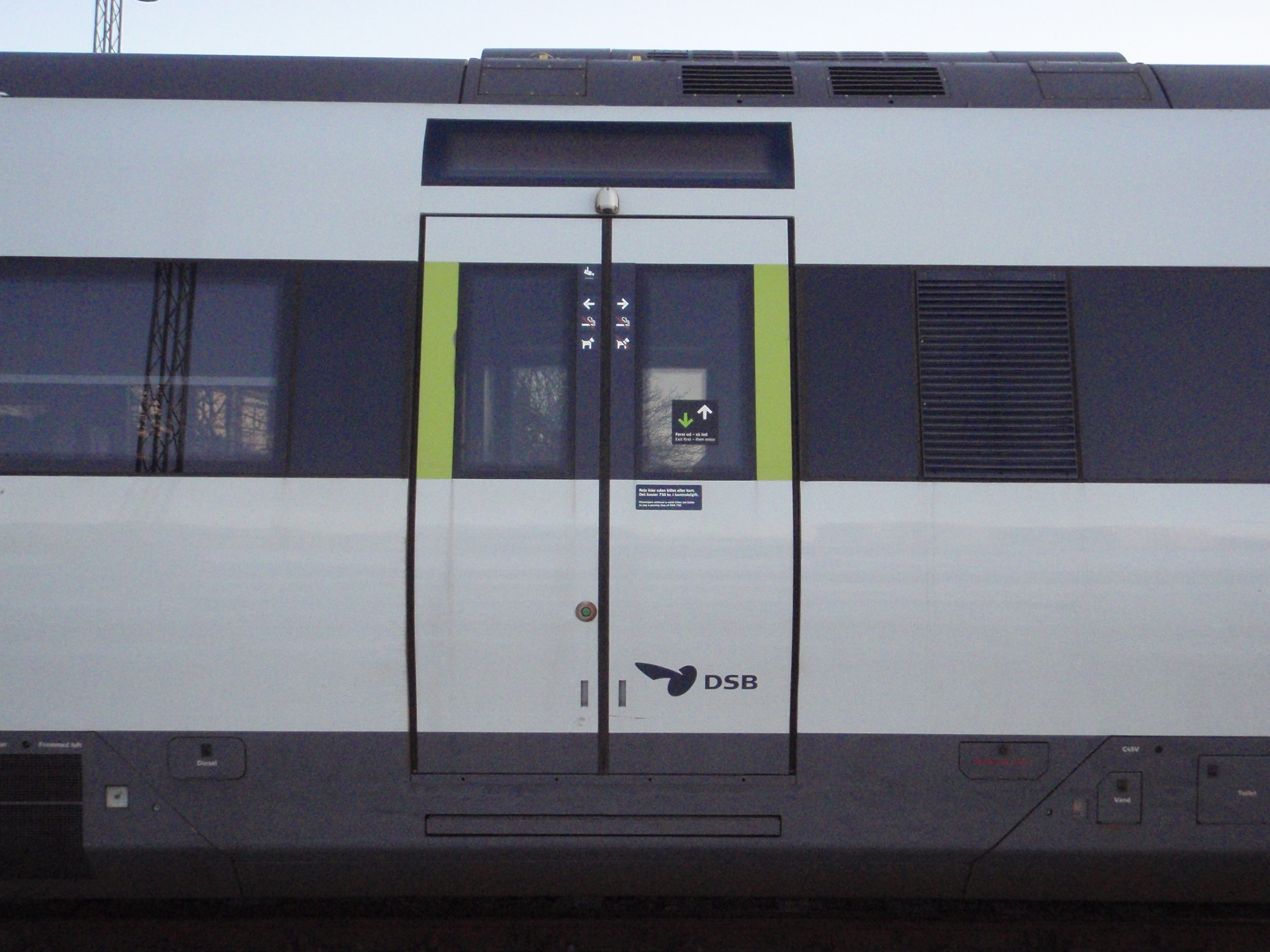
DSB logo in dark blue and entry doors partially in green (unit 5639)

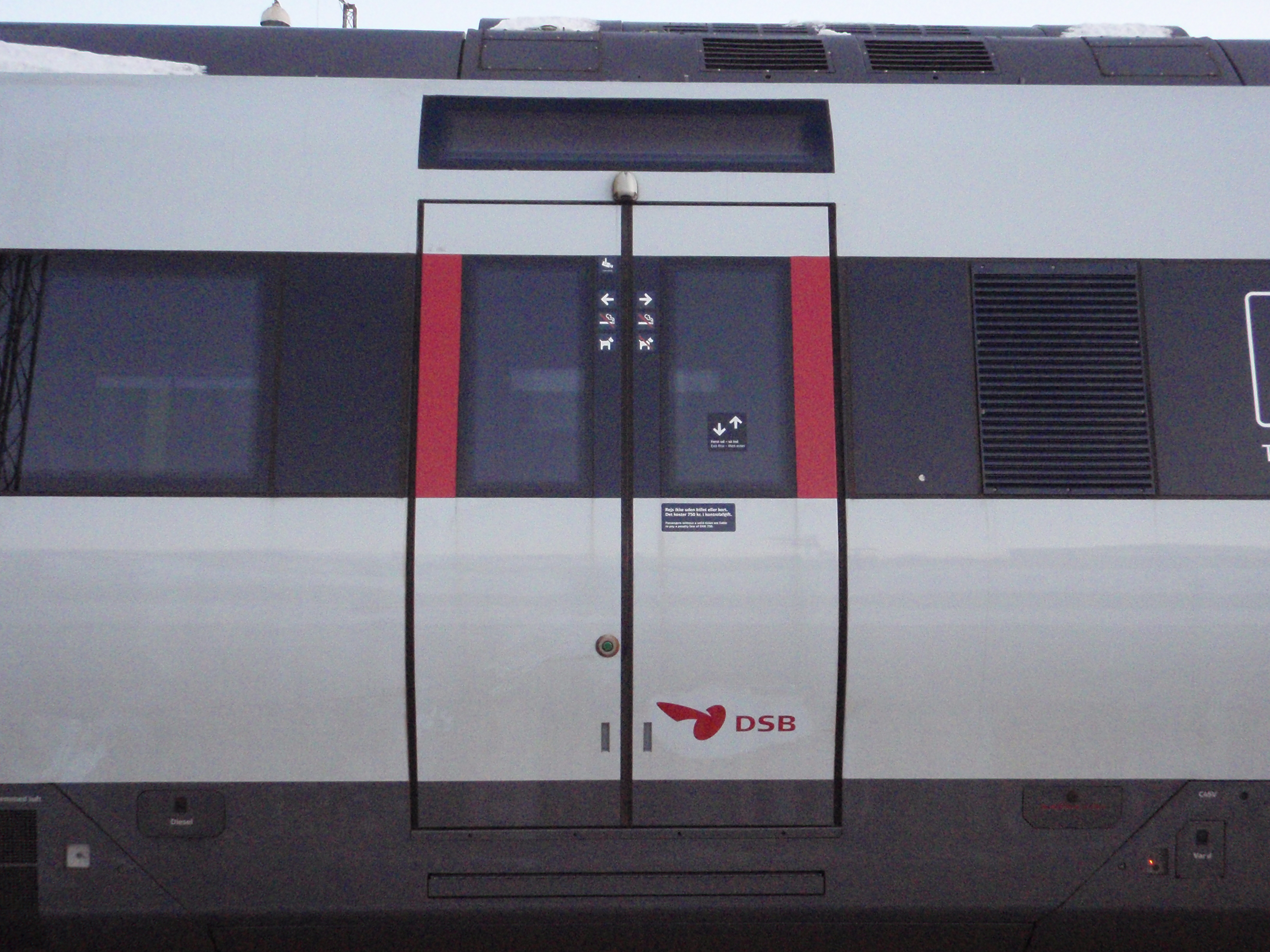
DSB logo and entry doors partially in red (unit 5653)

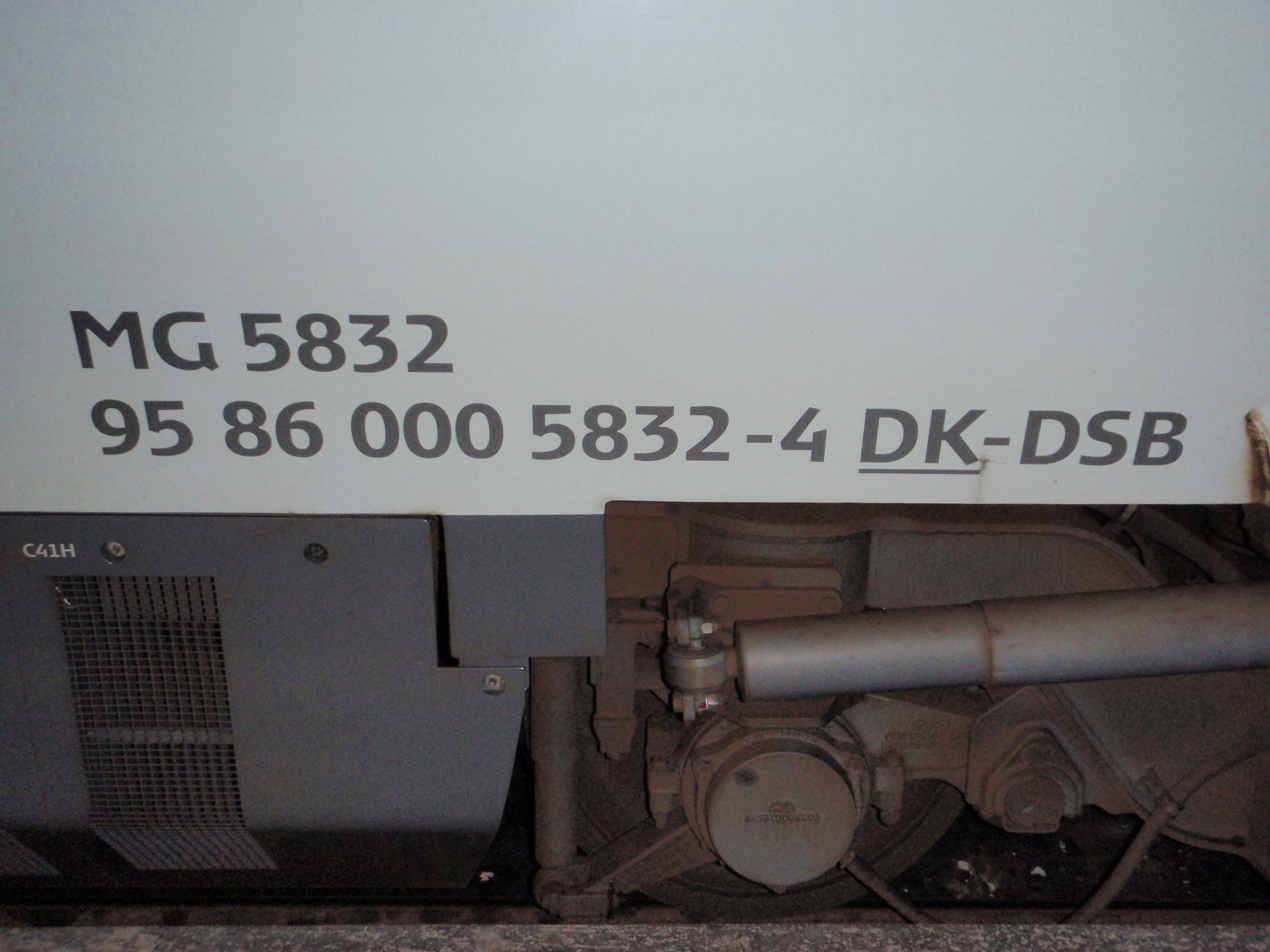
ID from the vehicle register and part of a Jacobs bogie

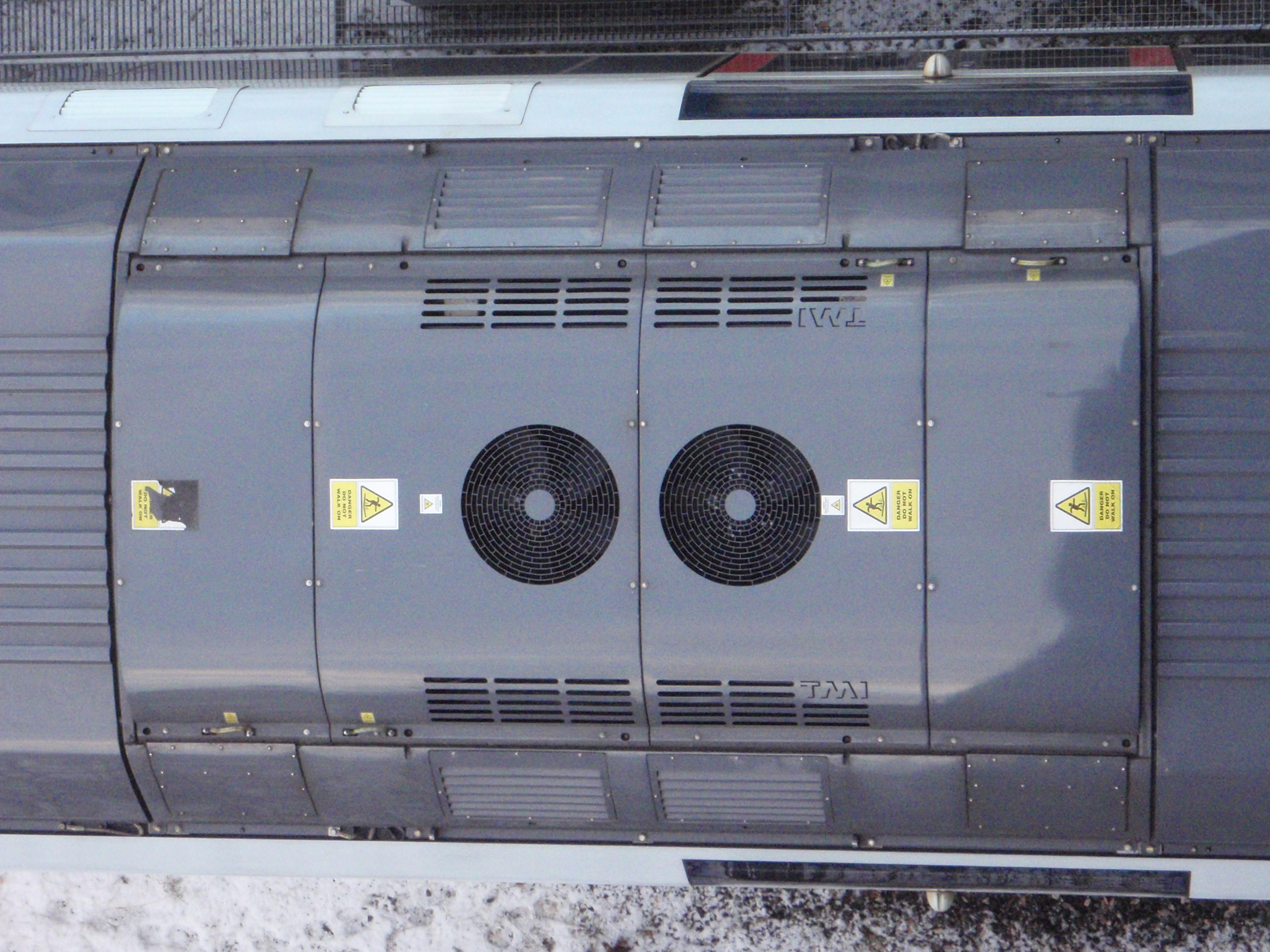
HVAC seen from above

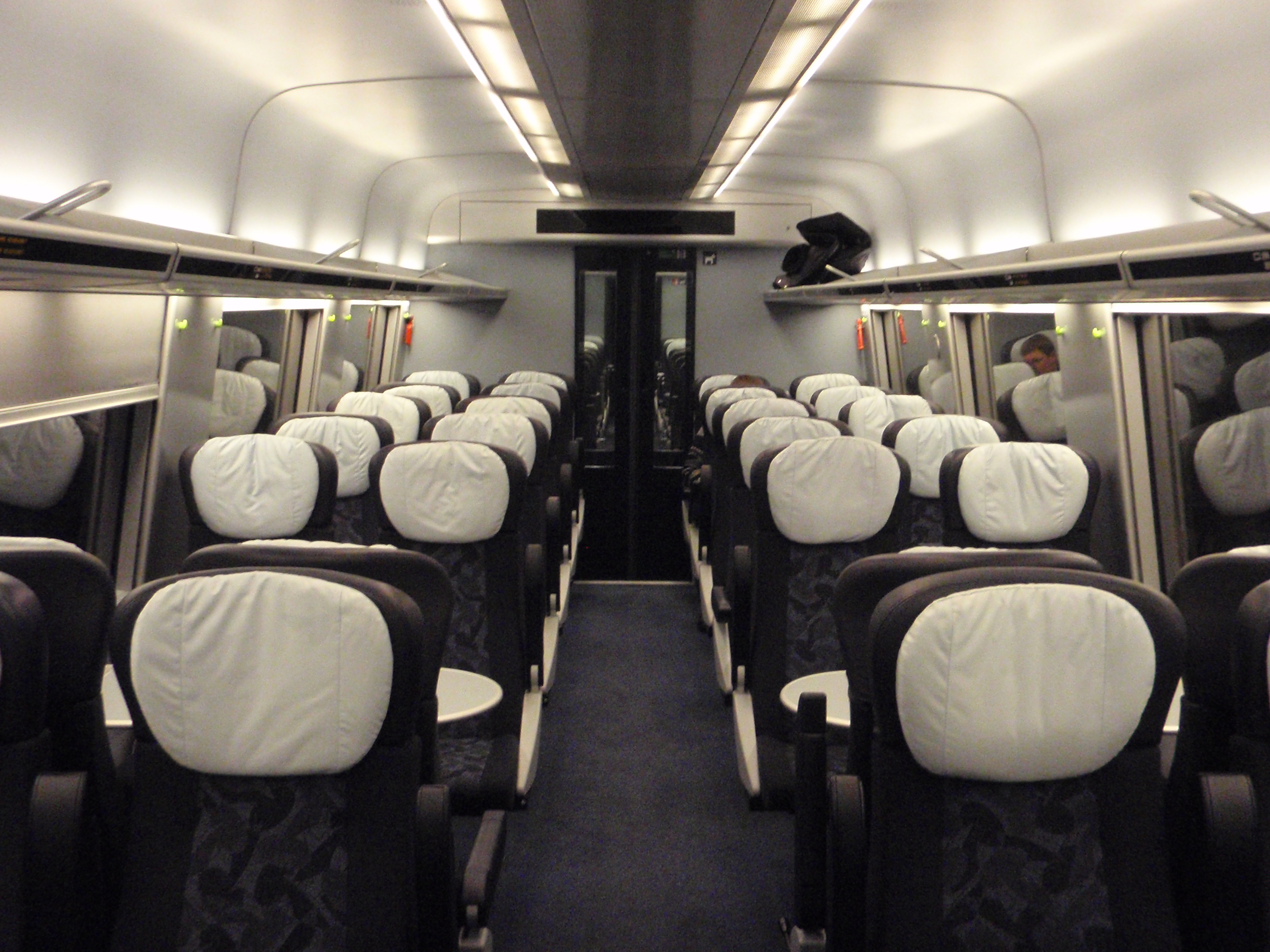
32-seat compartment

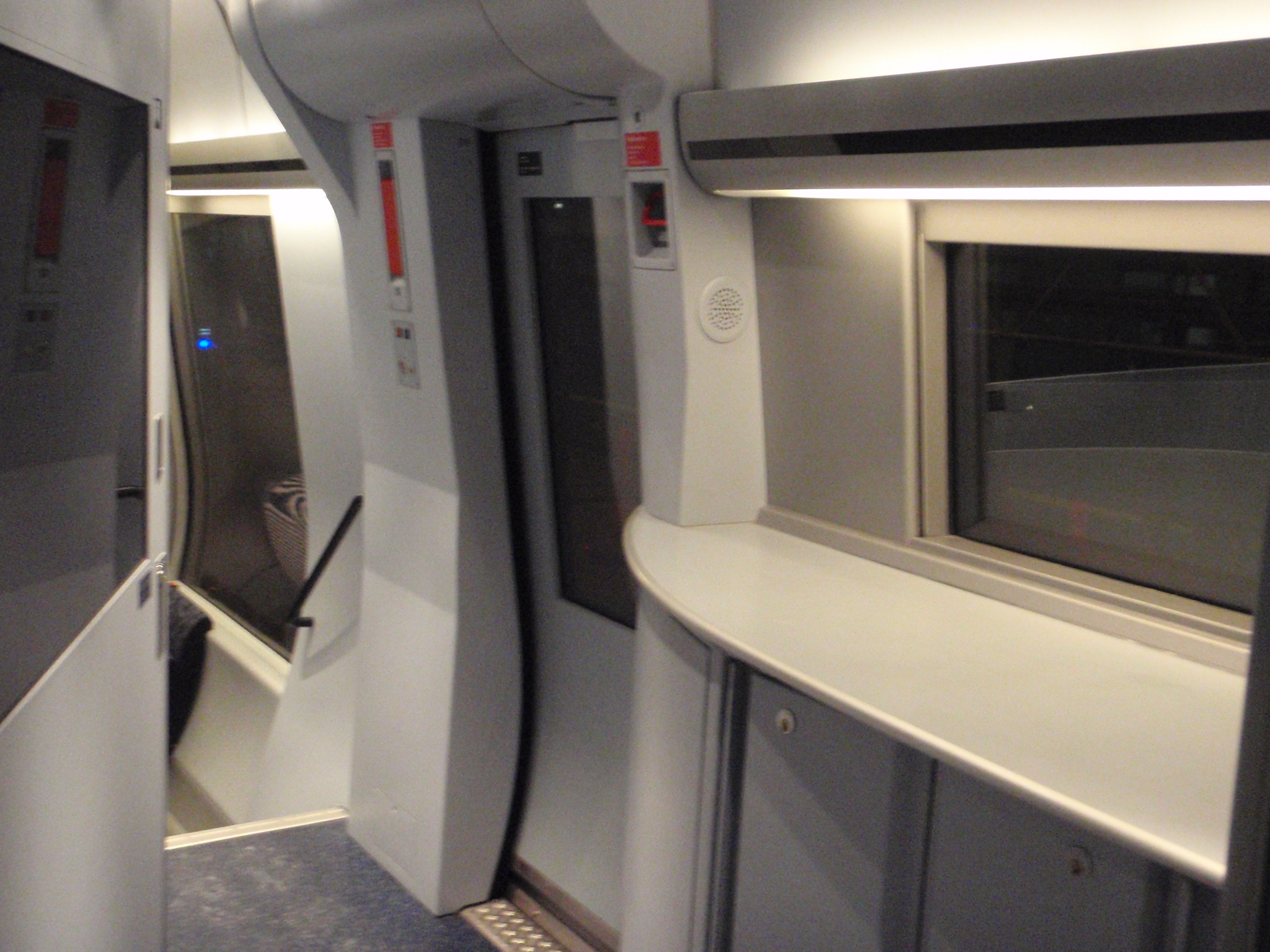
Bistro

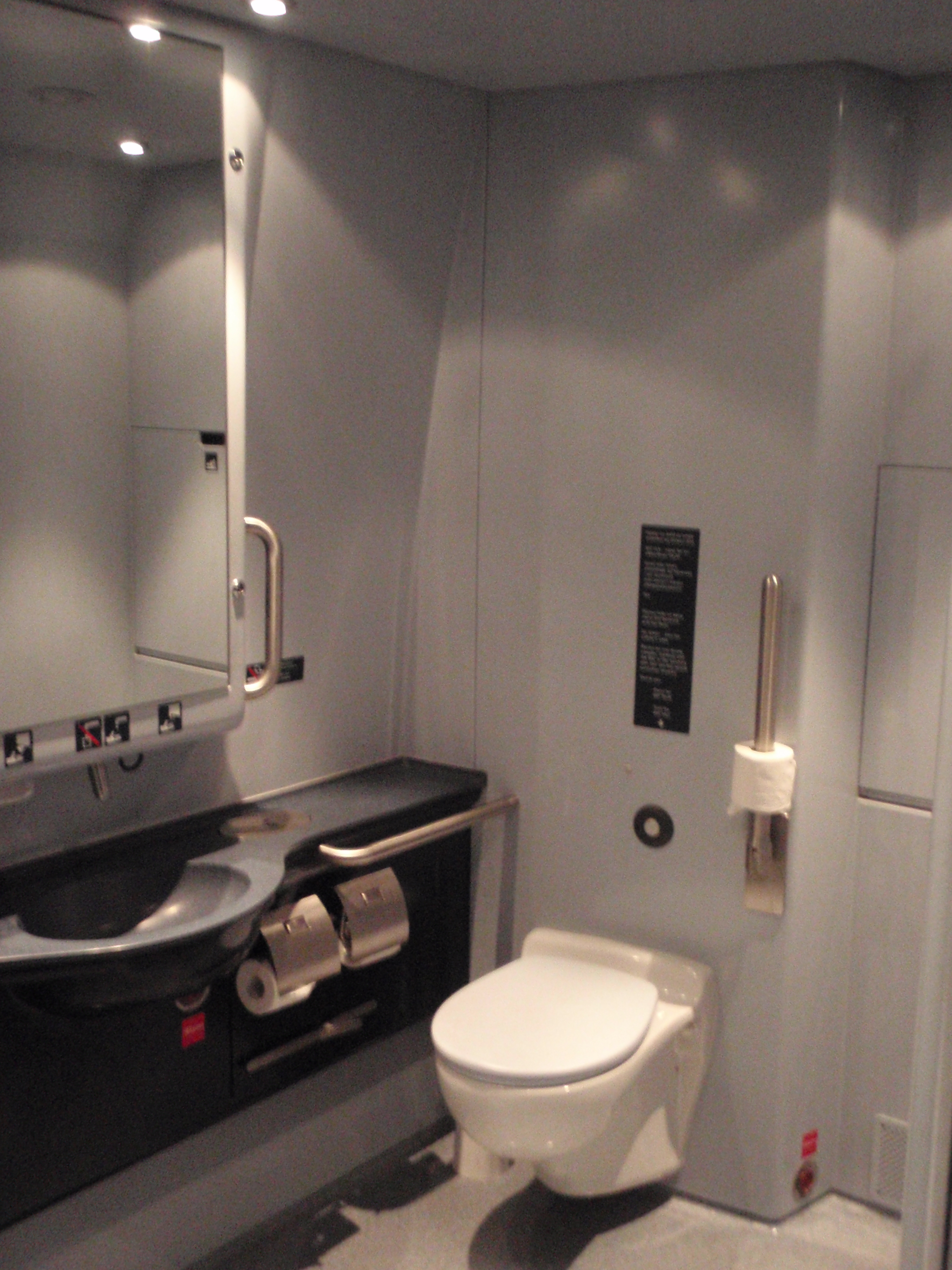
Low-floor coach – Toilet compartment

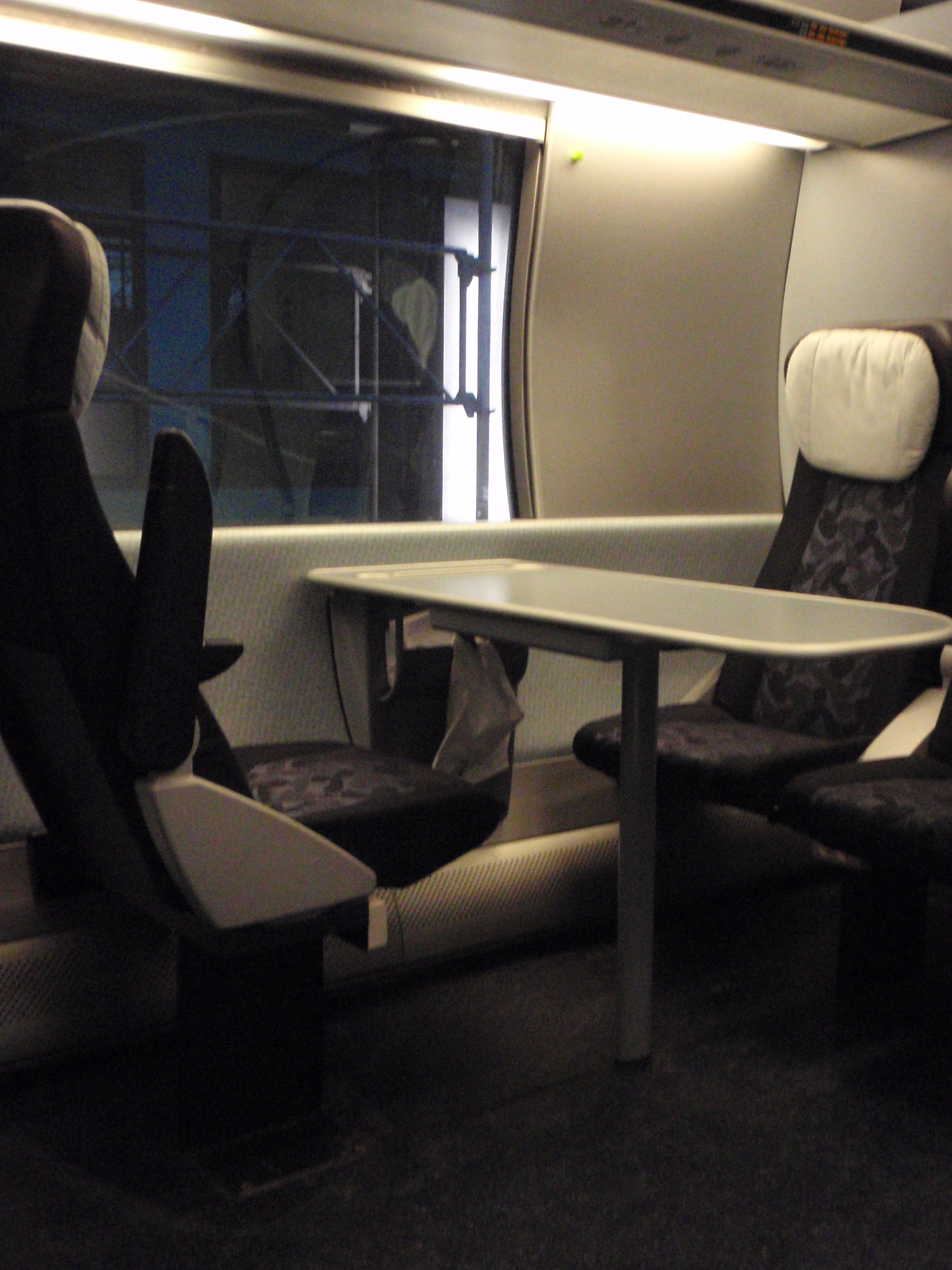
Low-floor coach - Space for a wheelchair

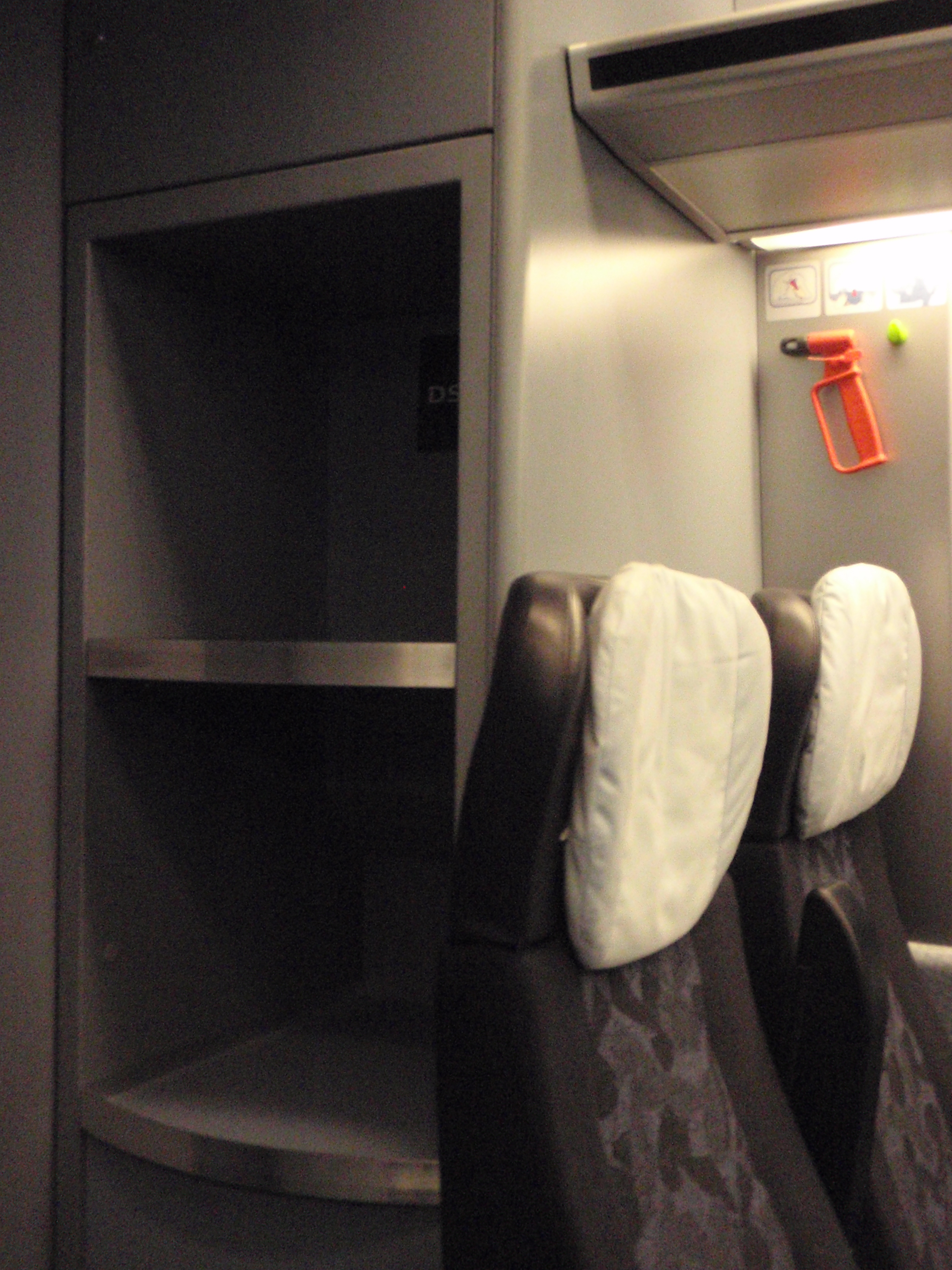
Luggage area at each end of the MG units

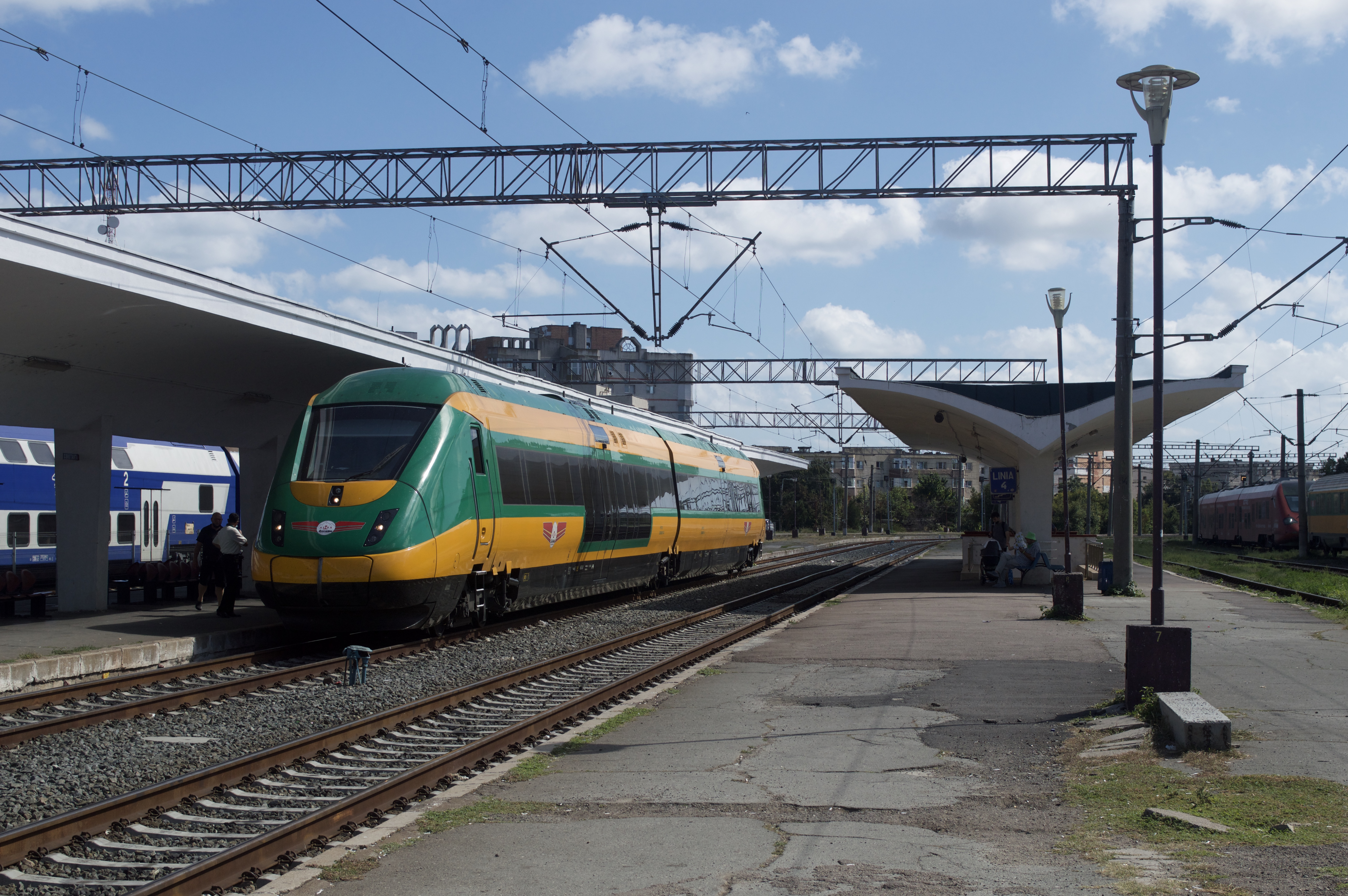
Astra Trans Carpatic IC2

== See also ==
- List of high-speed trains
