= FS Class E.403 =

Italian locomotive class

FS class E.403
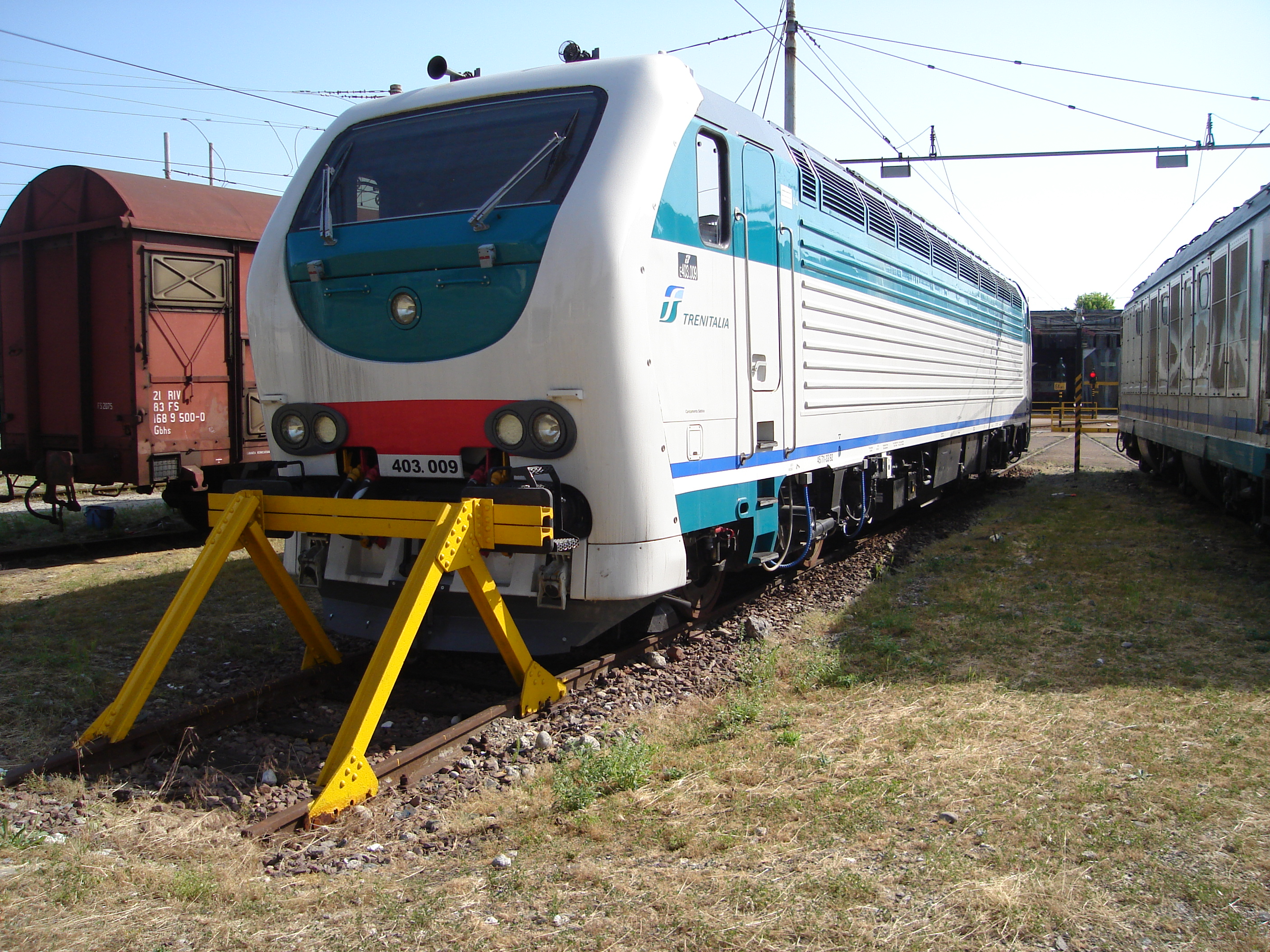
Type and origin
- Power type: Electric
- Builder: AnsaldoBreda (Italy)
- Build date: 2006-2010
Specifications
- Configuration
  - UIC: Bo′Bo′
- Gauge: 1,435 mm (4 ft 8 1/2 in) standard gauge
- Length: 19.90 m (65 ft 3 in)
- Loco weight: 88 t (87 long tons; 97 short tons)
- Electric system/s: Catenary; 3,000 V DC, 25 kV AC
- Current pickup(s): Pantograph
- Traction motors: AC series
- Transmission: variable gear ratio: 45/71 or 33/92
- Safety systems: RS4; SCMT; ETCS
Performance figures
- Maximum speed: 180 km/h (112 mph)
- Power output: 5,600 kW (7,500 hp)
Career
- Operators: FS Trenitalia
- Number in class: 24
- Disposition: In service

E.403 is a class of electric locomotives to be used on fast freight trains by the Italian railway company FS Trenitalia. It is designed and manufactured in Italy by AnsaldoBreda.

== History ==
In the early 2000s Trenitalia developed plans to expand its freight operations into mainland Europe, especially on the Italy-Austria-Germany corridor. A new locomotive had to be conceived for the plans to become reality, and was originally designated E.402C. It was a further evolution of the E.402B locomotive, with additional equipment to operate in these countries and substantially different Hembot bogies. The locomotives would originally be delivered between 2004 and 2006.

The programme started to suffer major blows: as AnsaldoBreda built this locomotive series exclusively for Trenitalia, on a non-standard platform (unlike the TRAXX and EuroSprinter locomotives which share standard components) the costs were exploding. The locomotive was downsized with the removal of the 1.5 kV and 15 kV parts and French, German and Austrian safety systems. Instead Trenitalia took 51% of the shares in TXLogistik and sought approval for its E.412 locomotives in Austria and Germany. The (limited) Austrian and German approval was given in 2006, with TXLogistik drivers operating the trains in Austria and Germany.

The E.402C programme was renamed E.403 in 2005, with its characteristics finalised in the same year: the locomotive would now be used on fast freight trains, partly operating on the new high-speed lines. Delivery started in 2006 and approval was planned for 2007. However, by February 2010 no freight train has ever run on HS lines, and the E.403 are not yet entered in regular service. In the early months of 2010 Trenitalia decided to assign these locomotives to the Passenger Division.

== See also ==
- FS Class E.402
