= Fieldbus Foundation =

Fieldbus Foundation was an organization dedicated to a single international, interoperable fieldbus standard. It was established in September 1994 by a merger of WorldFIP North America and the Interoperable Systems Project (ISP). Fieldbus Foundation was a not-for-profit trade consortium that consisted of more than 350 of the world's suppliers and end users of process control and manufacturing automation products. Working together those companies made contributions to the IEC/ISA/FDI and other fieldbus standards development.

Unlike proprietary network protocols, Foundation Fieldbus is not owned by a company, it is an open, interoperable [fieldbus] that is based on the International Organization for Standardization's Open Systems Interconnection (OSI/ISO) seven-layer communications model. The Foundation specification is compatible with the officially sanctioned SP50 standards project of the Instrumentation, Systems, and Automation Society (ISA) and the International Electrotechnical Commission (IEC).

From its inception Fieldbus Foundation had taken a leadership role in the development of fieldbus digital communications and integrated system architecture based on regional and international standards. The foundation's history was one of growth and achievement, as fieldbus-based control solutions gained widespread acceptance in the global automation marketplace.

== Origins of the Technology ==
In the 1980s, considerable effort went into developing a digital communication standard for field devices. Credit is due those members of the ISA's SP50 committee who spent years defining technical requirements and building consensus for a digital fieldbus. In the interim, leading process control suppliers started work on their own proprietary digital communication standards. These multiple efforts resulted in a handful of competing protocols, none of which could work together.

=== Consensus in the industry ===
In late 1994, the path of fieldbus took a new, promising direction. Two parallel supplier consortiums–the InterOperable Systems Project (ISP) and WorldFIP North America–merged to form the Fieldbus Foundation. The new organization immediately brought critical mass to the effort to achieve an internationally acceptable fieldbus standard. The foundation organized development programs, conducted field trials, and established the industry's most rigorous program for testing and registration of fieldbus devices. Manufacturers, end users, academic institutions and other interested parties became members of the Fieldbus Foundation and developed open, non-proprietary specifications known as Foundation Fieldbus. This advanced digital communication solution was designed from the ground-up to support mission-critical control applications where the proper transfer and handling of data is essential. Foundation technology was created to replace incompatible networks and systems with an open, fully integrated architecture for information integration and distributed, real-time control. With Foundation technology, users gained the power to implement tightly integrated digital control based on unified system architecture and a high-speed backbone for plant operations. This, in turn, removed the previously experienced constraints on device and subsystem interoperability.

== Milestones ==
The Fieldbus Foundation achieved many important milestones along the way to the maturity and success of Foundation technology. These included:

- Completion of H1 draft preliminary specifications, May 1995
- Demonstration of H1 technology at Monsanto Chocolate Bayou, October 1996
- Registration of the first H1 fieldbus products, September 1998
- Completion of High Speed Ethernet (HSE) draft preliminary specifications, September 1999
- Registration of the first HSE linking devices, May 2001
- Demonstration of HSE and Flexible Function Blocks (FFBs) at ISP Lima, May 2005
- Completion of Foundation for SIF protocol specifications, 2005
- Demonstration of Foundation for Safety Instrumented Functions (SIF) technology at Shell Global Solutions, Amsterdam, May 2008
- Registration of the first H1 fieldbus cable, Oct. 2008
- Launch of collaborative initiative with ISA to implement wireless backhaul networks, Oct. 2008
- Release of SIF final technical specifications, Jan. 2009
- Announcement of first educational institutions offering certified Foundation Fieldbus training, Mar. 2009
- Fieldbus Foundation joins expanded Field Device Integration (FDI) industry initiative, Dec. 2009
- Registration of first fieldbus devices incorporating advanced field diagnostics, Nov. 2010
- Release of High Speed Ethernet Remote I/O (HSE-RIO) preliminary specification, Dec. 2010
- Registration of first hosts incorporating host profile 61b, April 2011
- Announcement of Foundation for Remote Operations Management (ROM) solution, Dec. 2011
- Registration of first H1 isolated device couplers, Sept. 2012
- Approval of wireless backhaul architecture model developed in collaboration with ISA
- First field demonstration of Foundation for ROM technology, conducted by Petrobras in Brazil, April 2013
- Launch of Project Gemstone to make the digital fieldbus automation experience easier, May 2013

Critical to the industry's acceptance of the technology was its standardization by recognized international governing bodies. These include:

- American National Standards Institute (ANSI)/International Society of Automation (ISA), September 1992
- International Electrotechnical Commission (IEC), December 1999
- European Committee for Electrotechnical Standardization (CENELEC), March 2000

The IEC voted to include the Foundation H1 and HSE specifications in the IEC 61158 international fieldbus standard. The CENELEC Technical Bureau added the Foundation H1 specifications to the EN 50170 Euronorm. In addition, Foundation H1 is the only implementation of the ANSI/ISA-50.02 standard.

=== Foundation for Safety Instrumented Functions (SIF) ===
The Fieldbus Foundation’s Foundation for SIF development project achieved its first major milestone at the end of 2003 with approval of the overall system concept by TÜV Rheinland Industrie Service GmbH, Automation, Software and Information Technology, a global, independent and accredited testing agency. In early 2006, the foundation announced that TÜV had granted Protocol Type Approval for its fieldbus specifications. TÜV Type Approval helps meet the growing worldwide demand for commercial, standards-based safety instrumentation incorporating Foundation technology. Foundation for SIF technology meets the rigorous requirements of the IEC 61508 standard for functional safety of electrical, electronic and programmable electronic safety-related systems, up to, and including, Safety Integrity Level (SIL) 3. In addition, end users can build systems per the IEC 61511 standard covering SIF functional safety in the process industries (IEC 61511 is available as the ANSI/ISA-84.00.01-2004 standard). International end user associations such as NAMUR (Germany) and JEMIMA (Japan) have voiced support for Foundation technology, and provided input from the end user community that aided in specification development. Approval and support by key international industry bodies gave users the confidence that their investments in Foundation control solutions were based on recognized global standards.

=== Foundation for Remote Operations Management (ROM) ===
One of the fastest growing segments in the world of process automation is remote operations management. As the name implies, remote operations refers to the management of automation assets that are located in or are dispersed throughout remote geographic locations where it is difficult or impossible to send personnel. This is not limited to remote offshore oil platforms and oil and gas pipelines. It can also include tank farms and terminals, water and wastewater treatment facilities, and any industry or application that requires remote access to automation assets Foundation for Remote Operations Management (ROM) is a suite of technologies and additions to the Foundation Fieldbus specification that provide for both a wireless and wired infrastructure for remote assets and applications. Foundation for ROM provides for direct access to information and diagnostics in wireless and remote I/O devices. Conversely, Foundation for ROM can take the data from those devices and place into the Foundation Fieldbus environment for data management and quality. Foundation Fieldbus is much more than just a communications protocol. The user layer allows for all kinds of flexibility and standardization of data management, and it is all built around the requirements of process automation. Foundation for Remote Operations Management provides an open path for integration of multiple wireless and wired networks, from conventional remote I/O to ISA 100.11a and WirelessHART™, and enables direct access to device information and diagnostics. It extends the range and capabilities of Foundation fieldbus to encompass many more devices throughout the plant — regardless of their communications technology.

==== Remote I/O Integration ====
The interface for conventional wired remote I/O and wired HART, dubbed RIO, was launched back in 2007. The HSE remote I/O (HSE RIO) specification allows end users to access high data requirement devices directly in the fieldbus host system via HSE high-speed fieldbus. The remote I/O specification allows all forms of conventional I/O to be brought into the native fieldbus environment easily. This solution makes discrete-in, discrete-out, analog-in, analog-out and Foundation H1 available over a common Ethernet network. Fieldbus Foundation released the Remote I/O portion of the specification in April 2011.

==== Wired and WirelessHART Integration ====
In September 2011, Fieldbus Foundation announced the preliminary specification addressing fieldbus transducer blocks for wired HART and WirelessHART devices, together with updates to the WIO System Architecture and WIO Data Structures related to the transducer block specification. The wired and WirelessHART technical specification defines a fieldbus transducer block used to represent HART devices within Foundation for ROM devices. Both wired HART and WirelessHART devices may be represented in this block. In addition, the specification describes the expected method for HART configuration tools and asset-managing hosts to access HART devices using the native HART command protocol transported through the Foundation High Speed Ethernet (HSE) network. The specification also defines structures to identify and maintain HART device status in wired multi-drop networks as well as in WirelessHART mesh networks connected to Foundation for Remote Operations Management devices.

==== ISA 100.11a Integration ====
The ISA 100.11a phase of the project has also made considerable progress in the integration of the ISA 100.11a wireless sensor network into the Foundation Fieldbus infrastructure. The draft preliminary specification has been completed, with preliminary specification, testing, and final specification to be completed within a year. Similar to WirelessHART devices, ISA 100.11a devices will be represented as transducer blocks in Foundation ROM devices.

==== HSE Backhaul team ====
In late 2008, Fieldbus Foundation and ISA entered into a cross-licensing agreement allowing the two organizations to collaborate on wireless networks. This agreement will assist the ISA100.15 working group in developing a wireless backhaul standard. Backhaul networks integrated remote locations and applications with central control facilities. The Foundation for ROM specification provides for HSE as the backhaul network for remote applications, available in both wired and wireless configurations. Future Integration of

==== Additional Networks ====
Foundation for ROM allows for future integration of other networks aside from ISA 100.11a, WirelessHART, and others. Future candidates include networks such as Modbus. The future potential to integrate a huge variety of networks is unlimited.
