= FS Class E.402 =

Class of electric locomotives

FS class E.402A
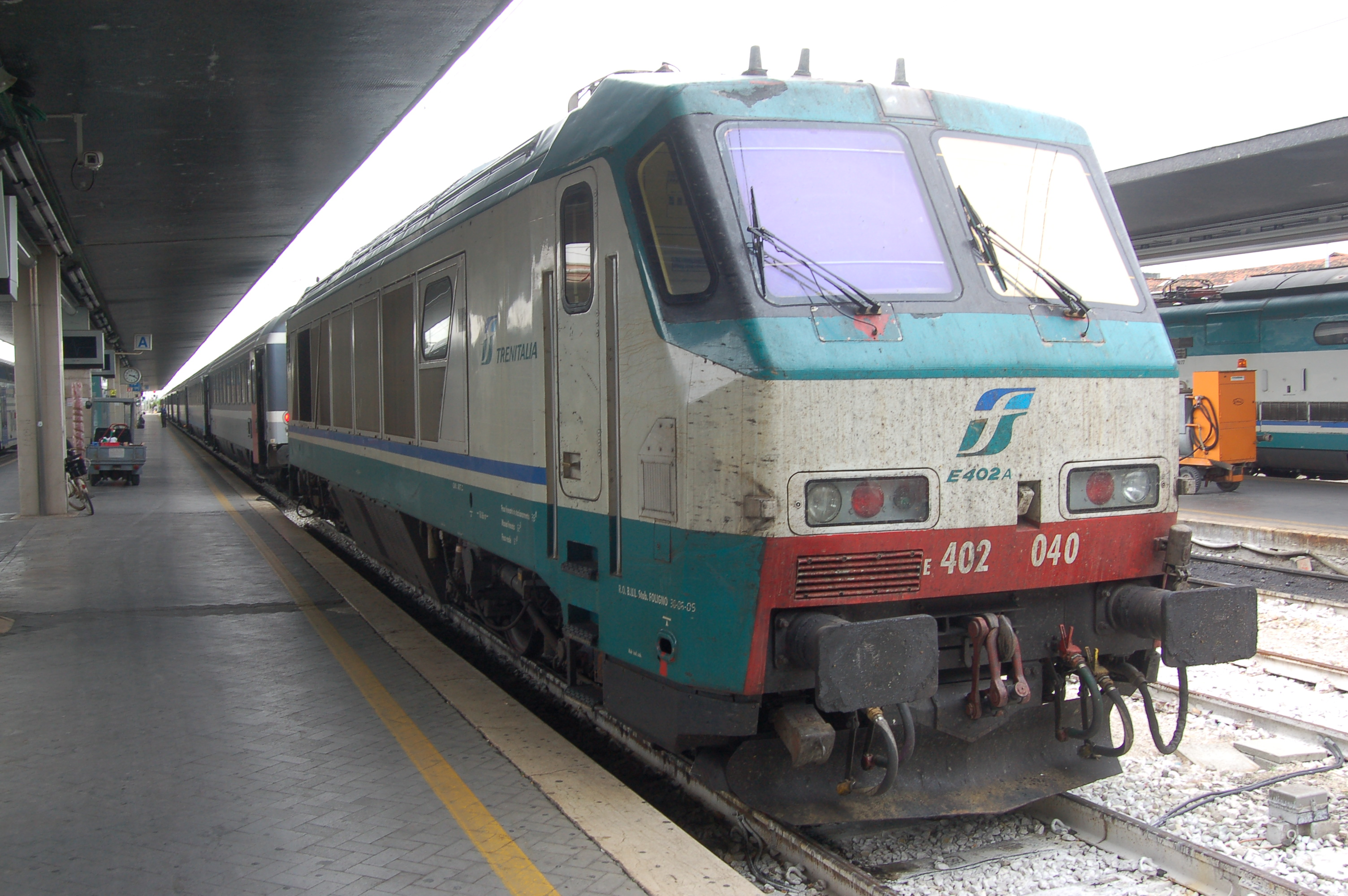
- E.402.040 at Venezia Santa Lucia station.
Type and origin
- Power type: Electric
- Builder: Ansaldo Trasporti, Firema Trasporti
- Build date: 1994-1996
Specifications
- Configuration
  - UIC: Bo'Bo'
- Gauge: 1,435 mm (4 ft 8 1/2 in) standard gauge
- Wheel diameter: 1.250 m (49.21 in)
- Length: 18.440 m (60 ft 6 in)
- Width: 3.000 m (9 ft 10 1/8 in)
- Height: 4.235 m (13 ft 10 3/4 in)
- Loco weight: 87 t (86 long tons; 96 short tons)
- Electric system/s: 3000 V DC Catenary
- Current pickup: Pantograph
- Traction motors: AC series
Performance figures
- Maximum speed: 220 km/h (140 mph)
- Power output: 6,000 kW (8,000 hp)
- Tractive effort: 250 kN (56,000 lb_{f})
Career
- Operators: FS Trenitalia
- Number in class: 42
- Disposition: Decommissioned in 2019

FS class E.402B
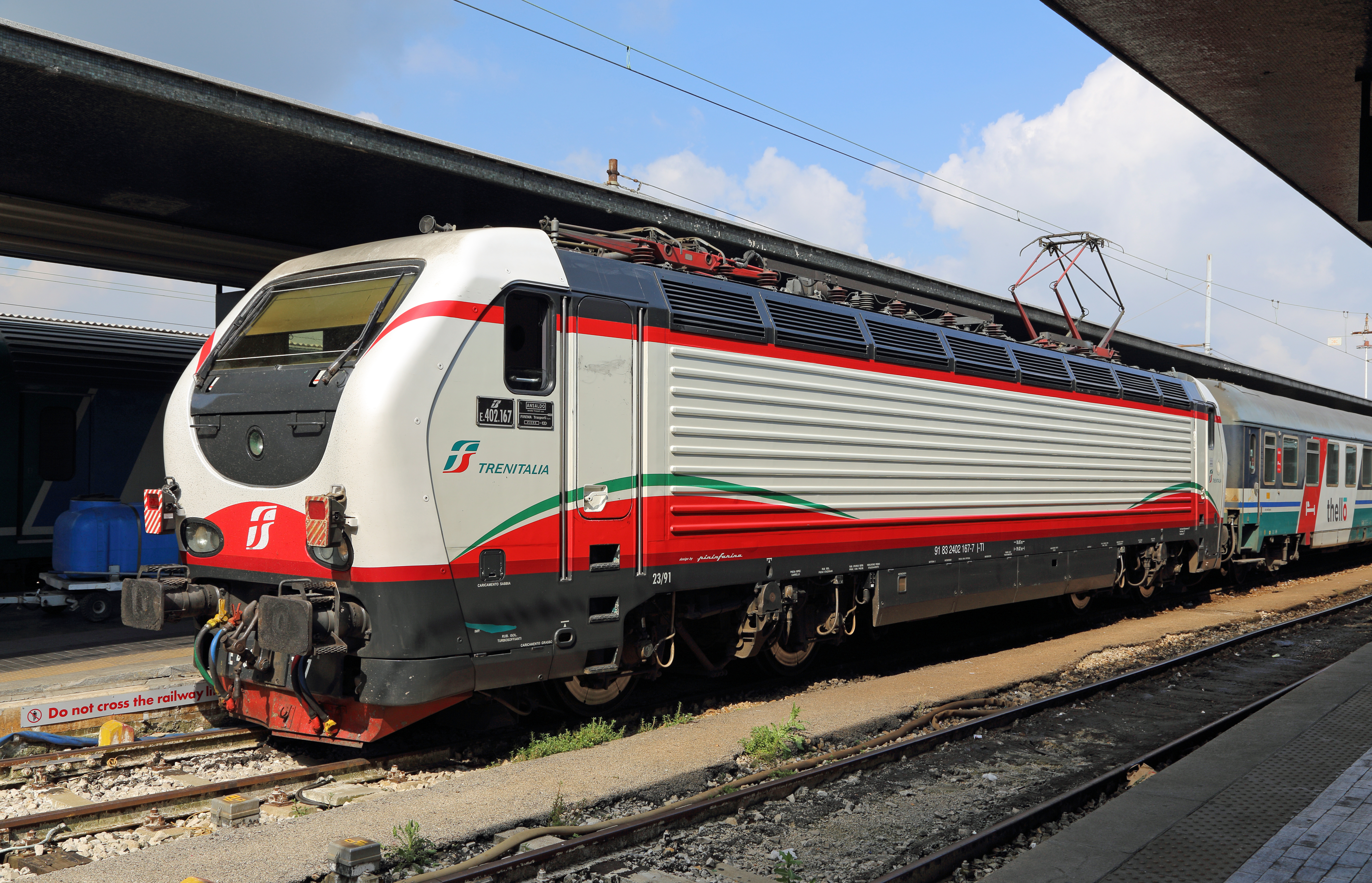
- E.402.167 in the new (2012) Frecciabianca livery at Venezia Santa Lucia station.
Type and origin
- Power type: Electric
- Builder: Ansaldo Trasporti, Firema Trasporti, ITIN, SOFER
- Build date: 1998-2000
Specifications
- Configuration
  - UIC: B'o B'o
- Loco weight: 89 t (88 long tons; 98 short tons)
- Electric system/s: Catenary; 3000 V DC, 15 kV 16⅔ Hz AC, 25 kV AC
- Current pickup: Pantograph
- Traction motors: AC series
Performance figures
- Maximum speed: 200 km/h (120 mph)
- Power output: 6,000 kW (8,000 hp)
- Tractive effort: 280 kN (63,000 lb_{f})
Career
- Operators: FS Trenitalia
- Number in class: 80
- Disposition: In service

E.402A/B is a class of electric locomotives mainly used on medium speed passenger trains (max 200-kilometre-per-hour (120 mph) services like InterCity or Frecciabianca) by the Italian railway company FS Trenitalia.

== History ==
After the positive experiences from the locomotive Class E.632 with DC traction motors with thyristors, FS wanted to order a new generation high performance locomotives with AC traction motors (also called Induction, three-phase or asynchronous motors). At the beginning of 1990s FS studied, in collaboration with the two companies Ansaldo Transporti (mechanical part) and TIBB (electric part, the Italian part of the BBC company) a new locomotive that could haul both heavy goods trains and high speed trains, the later at speeds up to 220 km/h (140 mph). The result was class E.402.0. Later, Siemens took over the development for the electric part.

A total of six prototypes have been built (E.402.000 - 005), which have seen a long phase of test runs before finally entering active service. The prototypes differ from the standard units because of the edgy shape of the driving cabin, similar to the one of E.632/633 locomotives, while the others have a more aerodynamic one. Class E.402 was one of the first Italian locomotive fitted with induction motors.

Prototype 402.001…402.005 (tot 5) First Batch 402.006…402.045 (tot 40)

In July 2014 FS made a contract with Spanish CAF to modernise 40 series production locomotives numbered E.402.006 - 045. The upgrade work also includes rebuilding the locomotives with a single cab. After modernisation the locomotives will be used on IC services.

=== E.402B ===
E.402B represent an evolution of the class E.402, with different driving cabins and equipment. 80 units have been built (numbered 101-180).

This locomotive, unlike its predecessor, is able to run under different voltages, the Italian standard 3 kV DC and the new high speed lines at 25 kV AC. Further, units 139-158 are able to run under French 1.5 kV DC (at half power), and are classified as E.402BF (F stands for Francia, France). They mount a single ATR90 pantograph and two single arm pantographs for use on French network (1.5 kV DC and 25 kV AC), and French safety systems (Vacma, radio, KVB). Curiously they haven't been authorized to go to Ventimiglia and Modane stations, which are on the border with France, and have 1.5 kV DC catenary.

E.402BF, also, can be used to remote command another locomotive of the same class, but not to be remote commanded from driving coach; on normal E.402B, this is reversed.

Today both classes are often seen hauling Intercity, sometimes freight services and are the only locomotives able to be remote commanded by Z1 driving cars via TCN, allowing push-pull services.

== Technical details ==
Both locomotives have four asynchronous three-phase motors, but the traction circuit is different:

- E.402A has two three-phase inverters and two choppers (one per bogie) which can feed the motors with a variable voltage ranging from 0 to 4200 V, depending on catenary voltage (from a minimum of 1200 to 4000 V)
- E.402B uses a rectifier when under 25 kV and choppers when under 3 and 1.5 kV which feed the two water-cooled GTO inverters.

The auxiliary equipment (fans, compressors ecc.) are fed at 450 V 60 Hz AC voltage produced by two 210 kVA static converters.

== See also ==
- FS Class E.403
