= Train communication network =

A hierarchical combination of two fieldbus for data transmission within trains

Train communication network (TCN)
- Governing body: TrainCom

Protocol information
- Type of network: Device bus, process control
- Physical media: Twisted pair, glass fiber
- Network topology: Bus
- Device addressing: hardware/software

A train communication network (TCN) refers to a specific implementation for how equipment installed on a train communicates with other equipment installed on the same train. It is defined in international standard IEC 61375. This specific standard uses two fieldbus networks. It consists of the Multifunction Vehicle Bus (MVB) inside each vehicle and of the Wire Train Bus (WTB) to connect the different vehicles.

== Multifunction vehicle bus (MVB) ==
The MVB connects individual nodes within a vehicle or closed train set. Unlike the WTB, there is no single connector standard for the MVB – instead, there are 3 defined media and connector classes:

- OGF (Optical Glass Fibre) uses 240-micron (6/635-in) fiber up to 2000 m (6600 ft)
- EMD (Electrical Medium Distance) uses shielded twisted pair with RS-485 transmitters and transformers for galvanic isolation, up to 200 m
- ESD (Electrical Short Distance) uses simple backplane wiring without galvanic isolation, up to 20 m

The plugs and sockets are the same as used by Profibus, with 2 x DE-9 sockets per device.

For OGF, the media sources are connected by repeaters (signal generators) being joined on a central star coupler. A repeater is also used for the transition between mediums.

There is no inauguration, the addresses are statically allocated. The number of addressable devices depends on the configuration of the vehicle bus – there may be up to 4095 simple sensors/actuators (Class I) and up to 255 programmable stations (Class 2, with configuration slots). The physical level is using transmissions at a 1.5 Mbit/s data rate using Manchester II encoding. The maximum distance is determined on the restriction of a maximum allowed reply delay of 42.7 μs (where for longer distances a second mode is used that allows up to 83.4 μs with reduced throughput, in case MVB is used for switchgear on the track side) while most system parts communicate with a response time of a typical 10 μs.

=== History ===
MVB was derived from the P215 bus developed by Brown Boveri Cie (now ABB) in Switzerland, incorporating the publisher/subscriber principle from early field busses (DATRAS). Back in 1984, IEC TC 57 defined the requirement specifications for busses to be used in electrical substation in collaboration with IEC SC65C. MVB presents many similarities with the FIP field bus (originally from French: Flux d'Information vers le Processus, relabeled as Factory Instrumentation Protocol or some references also use the hybrid "Flux Information Protocol") that was developed in the French NFC 46602 standard series. Since both stemmed from the same IEC TC 57 specifications. This explains why MVB and FIP have similar operation (cyclic and event-driven), only the arbitration method in case of multiple access differs, as MVB used a binary bisection mode relying of collision detection while FIP piggy-backed a "look-at-me" bit over periodic data. Efforts to merge FIP and MVB failed at the stubbornness of the two parties. MVB, Profibus and WorldFIP were proposed as a substation bus in IEC TC 57, but to avoid parallel solutions, IEC TC 57 decided that none will be used and favored Ethernet as a common denominator.

The MVB frames are not compatible with IEC 61158-2 fieldbus frames as it omits most of the preamble synchronization (which is not required if zero-crossing detection is possible). The paradox situation is that the IEC 61158 field bus and MVB physical layer were developed by the same persons in IEC TC 57. The difference came from the fieldbus physical layer which assumes a phase-locked loop to decode the Manchester data, requiring a preamble to synthonize the decoder, while MVB operated principally with optical fibres where this method is useless, MVB's decoding relies on zero-crossing detectors and Manchester pattern recognition.

However most of the modern development and test equipment can equally communicate WTB/MVB frames as well as Profibus frames on the line as the telegram structure similar to Profibus.

The WorldFIP connectors found usage in train equipment in France and North America (by Bombardier) until a joined effort on a common UIC train bus was started (with Siemens and other industry partners) that led to the WTB/MVB standard in late 1999.

=== Alternate vehicle buses ===
The MVB standard was introduced to replace the multitude of field buses in the train equipment. Despite the advantages of the MVB field bus, many vehicle buses are still built from CANopen, WorldFIP (in France), LonWorks (in the USA) and Profibus components. While the WorldFIP, CANopen, Lonworks and Profinet are controlled by international manufacturer associations targeting a wide range of application, MVB was tailored to the rolling stock application, with the goal of plug compatibility, and therefore allows no options. This was intentional as the fight between the field busses raged in the 1990s and the decision of the IEC that any of the eight field busses was a standard did not help plug-compatibility.

MVB modules are more expensive than for instance CANopen or LonWorks components. This is not due to the communication technology: most devices implement the MVB protocol machine in a small area of an FPGA which is today anyhow present, and the costliest component remains the connector. But railways certification is costly and not always needed for uncritical applications such as comfort and passenger information. When total cost of ownership is considered, the cost of the hardware elements can easily be outweighed by additional engineering costs in the railways market with its small series.

In the USA, the IEEE RTVISC evaluated both MVB and LON as vehicle and train bus. The IEEE finally decided to standardize both in IEEE 1374, with a clear separation of tasks:

- MVB for critical operation such as traction control and signalling in the driver's cab,
- LON for uncritical and slow data transfer, but low-cost connections such as passenger displays and diagnostics. This separation is not always observed.

Additionally more and more components are added to rail vehicles that need far more bandwidth than any field bus can provide (e.g. for video surveillance), so switched Ethernet IEEE 802.3 with 100 Mbit/s is being introduced into train sets (according to the EN 50155 profile). Still all the alternate vehicle buses are connected to the Wire Train Bus.

MVB is similar to FlexRay, both have the "process data", which is called "static segment" in FlexRay, and "message data", which is the "dynamic segment" and are driven by a fixed TDMA scheme. Running FlexRay with 2.5 Mbit, an RS-485 physical layer and only one "coldstarter" would lead to a very similar behavior in respect to the application. Despite the similarities, no rail-manufacturer has considered FlexRay, since they valuated a common solution higher than a multitude of better busses. Conversely, in 1999, the automotive industry evaluated MVB (in an extended 24 Mbit/s version), but dropped it because of the costs, which should be unreasonably low for the mass-market of millions of vehicles.

== Wire train bus (WTB) ==
The wire train bus has been designed for international passenger trains with variable composition, consisting of up to 22 vehicles.

The medium consists of a duplicated shielded twisted pair cable, which runs in the UIC cables between the vehicles.

The connector between the vehicles is the 18-pole UIC connector. Since connectors are exposed and can oxidize, a current pulse is applied at connection establishment to evaporate the oxide layer, called fritting. The standard connector for the WTB nodes is a 9-pin DIN connector.

The physical level uses RS-485 levels at 1 Mbit/s data rate. The encoding uses a Manchester II code and a HDLC frame protocol with proper voltage balancing to avoid DC components in the galvanic isolation transformers. The Manchester decoder uses a phase/quadrature demodulation (not RS-485, that operates with zero-crossings) which allows to span 750 m (2,460 ft) under worst-case conditions, especially when only the two extremity vehicles are equipped, as is the case with multiple traction for freight trains. No repeaters are foreseen since vehicles in between can have discharged batteries.

A unique property of the WTB is the train inauguration (Zugtaufe in German) in which the newly connected vehicles receive an address in sequence and can identify the vehicle side (called port and starboard like in the marine) so that doors open on the correct side. Up to 32 addresses can be dynamically allocated. When two train compositions join, the addresses are reallocated to form a new composition of vehicles with a sequential address. Vehicles without WTB node ("conduction vehicles") are not counted.

The frames have a maximum payload of 1024 bits.

The WTB operates cyclically to provide deterministic operation, with a period of 25 ms, used mainly for the traction control. The WTB also supports sporadic data transmission for diagnostics. The content of the periodic and sporadic frames is governed by the UIC 556 standard. Since frame size is limited, a version of TCP with reduced overhead was used for message segmenting and reassembly, that at the same time allows to cope with changes in composition, called RTP (Real-Time Protocol).

=== History ===
The WTB was derived from the German DIN bus developed by ABB Henschel (now Bombardier). It benefited from the phase/quadrature decoding provided by Italy and from an improved train inauguration provided by Switzerland, based on the experience with the FSK multiple traction bus of ABB Secheron, Geneva used in the SBB freight trains. The physical layer of WTB shows similarities with the WorldFIP field bus (EN 50170 part 4) - its "voltage mode" did use 1 Mbit/s and a maximum of 32 stations on the bus with a maximum length of 750 metres (2,460 ft), the use of transceivers for FIP was studied early in the TCN evaluation, but the Phase/Quadrature decoding was used instead.

== Usage ==
The TCN is used in most of the modern train control systems usually connecting the vehicles with an 18-pin UIC 558, including:

- Deutsche Bahn: ICE T, ICE-TD, ICE 3 and TRAXX AC2 P160
- Swiss Federal Railways: IC2000 and EW IV
- Austrian Federal Railways: All Railjet and Talent trains

== IEC 61375 standards ==
IEC 61375 is a suite of standards.

IEC 61375 suite of standards
Code	Title	Abstract
IEC 61375-2-1:2012	Electronic railway equipment - Train communication network (TCN) - Part 2-1: Wire Train Bus (WTB)	IEC 61375-2-1:2012 applies to data communication in Open Trains, i.e. it covers data communication between consists of the said open trains and data communication within the consists of the said open trains.
IEC 61375-2-2:2012	Electronic railway equipment - Train communication network (TCN) - Part 2-2: Wire Train Bus conformance testing	IEC 61375-2-2:2012 applies to all equipment and devices implemented according to IEC 61375-2-1, i.e. it covers the procedures to be applied to such equipment and devices when the conformance should be proven. The applicability of this standard to a TCN implementation allows for individual conformance checking of the implementation itself and is a pre-requisite for further interoperability checking between different TCN implementations.
IEC 61375-2-3:2015	Electronic railway equipment - Train communication network (TCN) - Part 2-3: TCN communication profile	IEC 61375-2-3:2015 specifies rules for the data exchange between consists in trains. The aggregation of these rules defines the TCN communication profile. The objective of the communication profile is to ensure interoperability between consists of the said trains with respect to the exchange of information. For this purpose it defines all items which are necessary for communication interoperability: an architecture with defined train directions related to different train views; a common functional addressing concept; common communication protocol for data exchange between functions; a set of services for train communication control.; The contents of the corrigendum of December 2015 and October 2016 have been included in this copy.
IEC TS 61375-2-4:2017	Electronic railway equipment - Train communication network (TCN) - Part 2-4: TCN application profile	IEC TS 61375-2-4:2017(E) applies to the applications in trains, i.e. it covers the application profile for functions belonging to the Train Control and Monitoring System (TCMS). The application profile is based on the TCN communication system for the data communication between consists of the said trains. This document provides for a data interface with parameters and addressing of TCMS functions based on the communication profile laid out in IEC 61375-2-3. This document is applicable in rolling stock requiring interoperable coupling and uncoupling. This part of IEC 61375 may be additionally applicable to closed trains and multiple unit trains when so agreed between purchaser and supplier.
IEC 61375-2-5:2014	Electronic railway equipment - Train communication network (TCN) - Part 2-5: Ethernet train backbone	IEC 61375-2-5:2014 defines Ethernet Train Backbone (ETB) requirements to fulfil open train data communication system based on Ethernet technology. Respect of this standard ensures interoperability between local Consist subnets whatever Consist network technology (see IEC 61375-1 for more details). All Consist network definitions should take into account this standard to preserve interoperability. This standard may be additionally applicable to closed trains and multiple-unit trains when so agreed between purchaser and supplier.
IEC 61375-2-6:2018	Electronic railway equipment - Train communication network (TCN) - Part 2-6: On-board to ground communication	IEC 61375-2-6:2018 establishes the specification for the communication between the on-board subsystems and the ground subsystems. The communication system, interfaces and protocols are specified as a mobile communication function, using any available wireless technology. This document provides requirements in order to: a) select the wireless network on the basis of QoS parameters requested by the application; b) allow TCMS and/or OMTS applications, installed on-board and communicating on the on-board communication network, to have a remote access to applications running on ground installations; c) allow applications running on ground installations to have a remote access to the TCMS and/or OMTS applications installed on-board.
IEC TR 61375-2-7:2014	Electronic railway equipment - Train communication network (TCN) - Part 2-7: Wireless Train Backbone (WLTB)	IEC TR 61375-2-7:2014 describes the protocols stack of a radio based wireless train backbone which is used in distributed power freight trains. This part provides information on the physical layer, the data link layer, the application layer and distributed power application.
IEC 61375-2-8:2021	Electronic railway equipment - Train communication network (TCN) - Part 2-8: TCN conformance test	IEC 61375-2-8:2021 applies to all equipment and devices implemented according to IEC 61375-2-3:2015, IEC 61375-2-5:2014 and IEC 61375-3-4:2014, i.e. it covers the procedures to be applied to such equipment and devices when the conformance should be proven. The applicability of this document to a TCN implementation allows for individual conformance checking of the implementation itself, and is a pre-requisite for further interoperability checking between different TCN implementations.
IEC 61375-3-1:2012	Electronic railway equipment - Train communication network (TCN) - Part 3-1: Multifunction Vehicle Bus (MVB)	IEC 61375-3-1:2012 applies where MVB is required.
IEC 61375-3-2:2012	Electronic railway equipment - Train communication network (TCN) - Part 3-2: MVB (Multifunction Vehicle Bus) conformance testing	IEC 61375-3-2:2012 applies to all equipment and devices implemented according to IEC 61375-3-1, i.e. it covers the procedures to be applied to such equipment and devices when the conformance should be proven. The applicability of this standard to a TCN implementation allows for individual conformance checking of the implementation itself and is a pre-requisite for further interoperability checking between different TCN implementations.
IEC 61375-3-3	Electronic railway equipment - Train communication network (TCN) - Part 3-3: CANopen Consist Network (CCN)	IEC 61375-3-3:2012 specifies the data communication bus inside consists that are based on CANopen. CANopen was developed for use in, but is not limited to, industrial automation applications. These applications may include devices such as input/output modules, motion controllers, human–machine interfaces, sensors, closed-loop controllers, encoders, hydraulic valves or programmable controllers. This part of IEC 61375 applies to all equipment and devices operated on a CANopen-based consist network within TCN architecture as described in IEC 61375-1.
IEC 61375-3-4:2014	Electronic railway equipment - Train communication network (TCN) - Part 3-4: Ethernet Consist Network (ECN)	IEC 61375-3-4:2014 specifies the data communication network inside a Consist based on Ethernet technology, the Ethernet Consist Network (ECN). The applicability of this part of IEC 61375 to the Consist Network allows for interoperability of individual vehicles within Open Trains in international traffic. This part of IEC 61375 may be additionally applicable to closed trains and Multiple Unit Trains when so agreed between purchaser and supplier.
