= Foundation Fieldbus H1 =

Communication protocol

- Governing body: FieldComm Group

Protocol information
- Type of network: Process Control
- Physical media: Twisted Pair, fiber
- Network topology: Star, Bus
- Maximum devices: 32 nodes/segment
- Maximum distance: 9500 meters with 4 repeaters(depending on minimum signal strength and power to reach the field devices)
- Device addressing: Automatic when connected to segment

Foundation Fieldbus H1 is one of the Foundation Fieldbus protocol versions. Foundation H1 (31.25 kbit/s) is a bi-directional communications protocol used for communications among field devices and to the control system. It utilizes either twisted pair, or fiber media to communicate between multiple nodes (devices) and the controller. The controller requires only one communication point to communicate with up to 32 nodes, this is a significant improvement over the standard 4–20 mA communication method, which requires a separate connection point for each communication device on the controller system.

The Foundation Fieldbus H1 has support for intrinsically safe wiring. Unlike other protocols, Foundation H1 provides explicit synchronization of control and communication for precisely periodic (isochronous) communication and execution of control functions with minimized dead time and jitter. It synchronizes clocks in fieldbus devices for support of Function Block scheduling and alarm time-stamping at the point of detection.

The original concept was to connect as many fields devices as possible on controller field connection, limited only by signal strength.

== Foundation HSE ==
Foundation HSE is a control network technology specifically designed for process automation to connect higher-level devices such as controllers and remote-I/O, high-density data generators etc., and for horizontal integration of subsystems.

Foundation HSE is based on unmodified IEEE 802.3 Ethernet and, therefore, is compatible with standard Ethernet equipment. FOUNDATION HSE provides complete "DCS style" redundancy with redundant network switches, redundant devices, and redundant communication ports ensuring unsurpassed availability. Foundation HSE is also based on standard IP, enabling it to coexist with other devices and ensuring compatibility with standard tools. At the highest level, Foundation HSE includes a standard application layer that provides interoperability between devices beyond the mere coexistence provided by Ethernet and TCP/IP. Foundation HSE communication is schedule-driven to minimize dead-time and jitter with support for peer-to-peer communication directly between devices. Again, a rigorous interoperability testing program ensures quality connectivity.

The hub-and-spoke tree topology of Ethernet makes it very easy to add and remove devices without upsetting the operating network. Because Foundation HSE is based on unmodified Ethernet, standard Ethernet tools can be used for installation qualification, testing, and troubleshooting. These tools speed up the resolution of communication problems. Foundation HSE is supported by better troubleshooting tools not available for RS485 and coax. Since Foundation HSE is based on UDP and TCP, standard network management tools employing SNMP, RMON, etc., can be used. Similarly, familiar IP addressing is used including support for DHCP.

== Parameters ==
The communication line can stretch 1900 meters without repeaters or 9500 meters with up to four allowed repeaters.

== Communication Methods ==
The communication methods supported are:

- Client/Server

The Client/Server Virtual Communications Relationship (VCR) Type is used for queued, unscheduled, user initiated, one to one, communication between devices on the fieldbus. Queued means that messages are sent and received in the order submitted for transmission, according to their priority, without overwriting previous messages.

- Publisher/Subscriber

The Publisher/Subscriber VCR Type is used for buffered, one-to-many communications. Buffered means that only the latest version of the data is maintained within the network. New data completely overwrites previous data.

- Report Distribution

The Report Distribution VCR Type is used for queued, unscheduled, user initiated, and one-to-many communications.

== Use ==
This protocol is primarily used for analog and discrete process control devices. The primary advantage is configuration by functional block concept.

== Power Supply ==
The big advantage of Foundation Fieldbus is that it allows power to be transferred over the communication bus to the controlled devices, this requires a Foundation Fieldbus power supply. Power supplies are normally redundant type with rating of 32 V DC with 500 mA current, and are mostly installed in the Marshalling Cabinet or System Cabinet in the Control Room.

== Termination ==
Every field bus segment needs exactly two terminators to operate properly. The terminators are designed to be the equivalent of a 1 μF capacitor and a 100 Ω resistor in series. The terminators serve several purposes including shunting the Fieldbus current (device communication) and protecting against electrical reflections. The primary function of terminators is to act as a current shunt for the control network. Fieldbus communication works by the field device modulating its current draw. When the devices need to transmit data, the FF devices will act as a current sink. The devices will draw less current to represent a high signal (1, one) and draw more current to represent a low signal (0, zero). As the modulating current of the FF devices is between 15 mA and 20 mA peak to peak, while the modulating voltage in the bus caused by this modulating current is between 0.75 V and 1 V peak to peak. This 0.75 and 1 V is simply a result of the 15 mA x 50 Ω which equal to 0.75 V and 20 mA x 50 Ω which is equal to 1 V. The 50 Ω resistor is an equivalent of two parallel resistors from the FF terminator. Because of all devices use the same cable, only one device can transmit a message at any given time. Without the proper number of terminators, the signal level will be out of specification and can disrupt the network.

Another function of the terminator is to reduce the impact of electrical reflections.

== Intrinsically Safe Fieldbus ==
There are several Intrinsically Safe Fieldbus technologies in the market. The most commonly used are:

- Entity Barrier Concept

This Design takes the concept of normal Field barriers that has been successfully used in the analog signal world(4-20 mA). These barriers use an infallible resistor (wire-wound), Zener diodes and a fuse, and require a good intrinsically safe ground. While this barrier limited energy sufficient for Zone 0/1 all Gas Groups (Class I Div 1 all Gas Groups), it only provides 80 mA for the Fieldbus segment. This optimistically could only power four Fieldbus devices which typically take 15-26 mA each. The Entity barrier concept is safe, but its low power limitations and engineering requirements effectively eliminate many of the benefits of using bus technology.

- FISCO

Fieldbus Intrinsically Safe Concept (FISCO), which was first developed by PTB (Physikalisch-Technische Bundesanstalt, the national metrological institute of Germany) as a method to provide higher power to a Fieldbus segment in hazardous areas. The FISCO concept, considers the entire circuit of the Fieldbus segment. The maximum total cable length in a FISCO system is 1 km in Gas Groups A and B (IIC) and 1.9 km in Gas Groups C and D (IIA and IIB), while the maximum allowed spur length (length from the segment junction box/protector) is 60 metres for Gas Groups A through D (IIC, IIB and IIA). Additional constraints are also placed on the power conditioners i.e. load-sharing redundant power conditioners are not allowed in a FISCO power supply.

Certifying devices to a standard before implementation, allows them to be integrated into systems without the engineering requirements necessitated by the Entity approach. This then allows FISCO power supplies to generate more power (and allow more devices per segment) than the Entity barrier solution. The bottleneck of this solution is that it requires each part of the system, including devices, cables and power conditioners to be FISCO compliant and that FISCO design and installation rules are strictly followed. While it does provide more power than the Entity barrier approach, still the system can only support four to five devices per segment as the trunk current is limited to 115 mA.

- HPT with Field Barriers

A more recent enhancement for intrinsically safe applications is the High Power Trunk (HPT) with field-based field barriers (FBs), which limits power at the spur, rather than the trunk. This method significantly changes the equation for end users of Fieldbus in hazardous settings. It increases the amount of available power and therefore the number of connected devices on a segment. It also lets end users maximize the length of their trunk cables without the restrictions of FISCO/Entity Barrier Concept.

While the HPT model does provide some significant improvements(500 mA at Fieldbus segment), it is not without its downsides. The field barrier is in essence a field-based isolated power conditioner. So even though the segment can be powered by load-sharing redundant power conditioners at the host, the practical MTBF (Mean Time Before Failure) is still that of a single power conditioner, since most field barriers are not redundant.

- Intrinsically Safe-High Power Trunk/High Power Intrinsically Safe Trunk (HPIST)

The High Power IS Trunk (HPIST) technique provides an enhanced level of safety and simplicity in installation, along with the ability to use it for all devices (FISCO and Entity) and hazardous Zones and Divisions. It delivers approximately 350 mA of IS power to segments located in hazardous areas.

This is achieved by utilizing a split-architecture design that puts part of the barrier in an isolator card located in the safe area (power supply rack) & the other part in each of the spurs of field-mounted device couplers/segment. The barrier in the isolator allows 350 mA to be run through the segment up to the Spur/junction Box through trunk cable. Since infallible resistors are used, devices from Zone 0/1 or 2 can be direct connected. Having 350 mA, now allows users to power up to 16 Fieldbus devices (20 mA each) at 500 m while retaining intrinsic safety.

== Development ==
This protocol is developed, enhanced and supported by FieldComm Group

== See also ==
- Computer networking
- Computer science
