= Beckhoff Automation =

German company

Beckhoff Automation GmbH & Co. KG
- Company type: GmbH & Co. KG
- Industry: Automation technology
- Founded: 1980
- Founder: Hans Beckhoff
- Headquarters: Verl, Germany
- Key people: Hans Beckhoff
- Revenue: €1.17 billion (2024)
- Number of employees: 5,300 (March 2025)
- Website: www.beckhoff.com

Beckhoff Automation is a German technology company in the field of automation technology for industrial manufacturing, the process industry, the energy industry, the entertainment industry, and building automation.

The company develops and produces universal and industry‑independent control and automation solutions based on the PC‑based control philosophy and is part of the Beckhoff corporate group.

The company currently employs 5,300 people worldwide (March 2025). Beckhoff Automation generated global revenue of €1.17 billion in the 2024 fiscal year and is represented with 41 subsidiaries and cooperation partners in more than 75 countries.

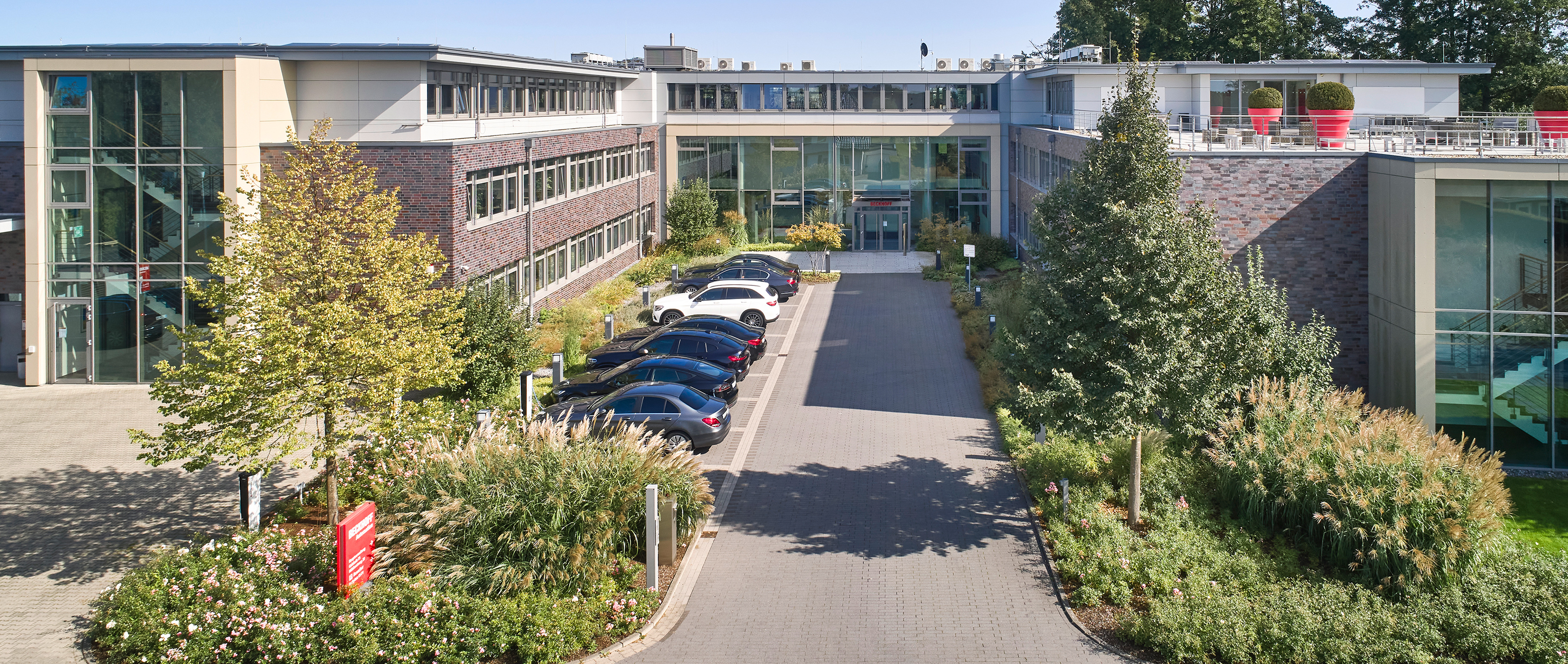
Headquarters of Beckhoff Automation in Verl

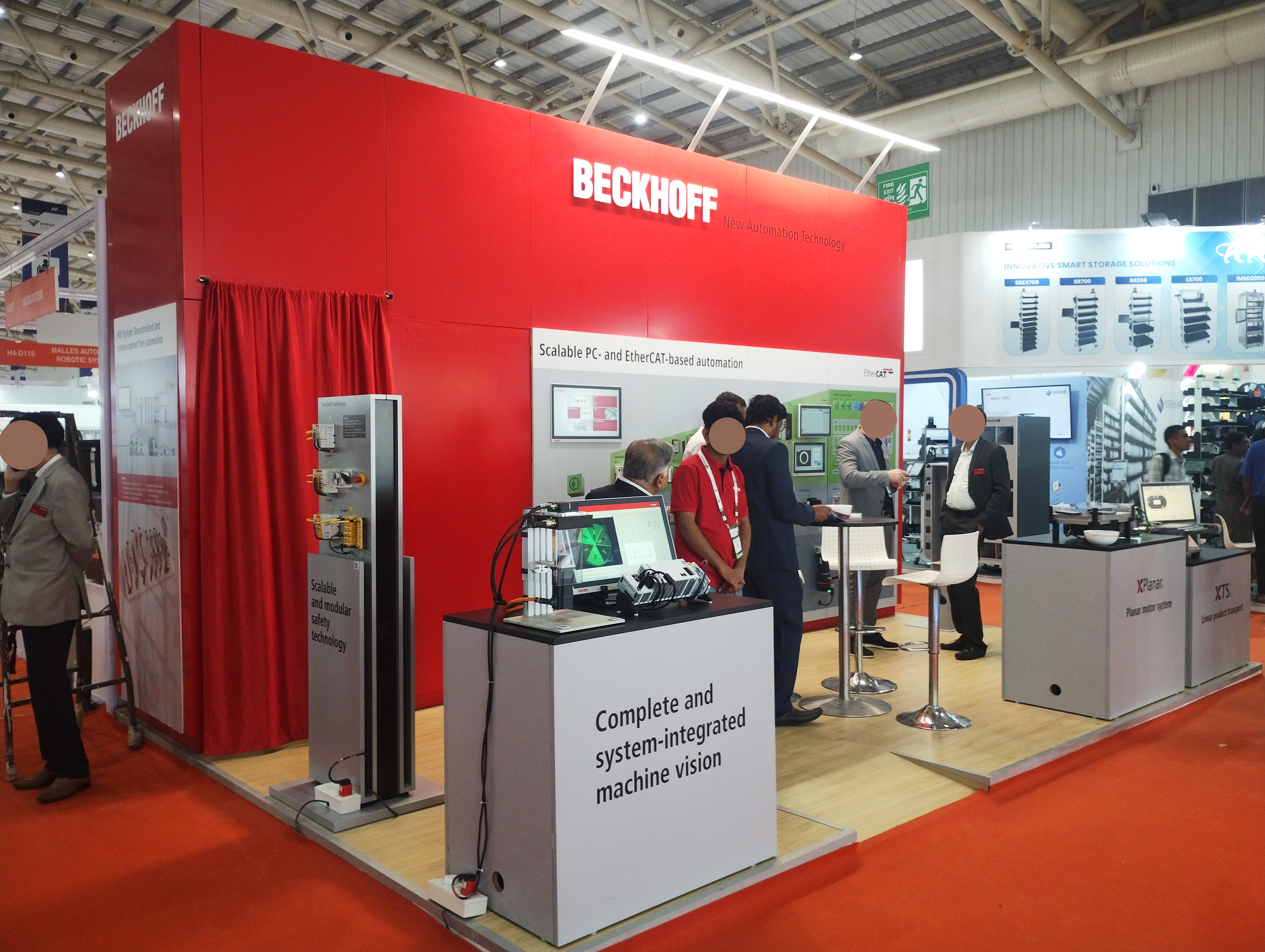
Beckhoff at Electronica 2025, BIEC

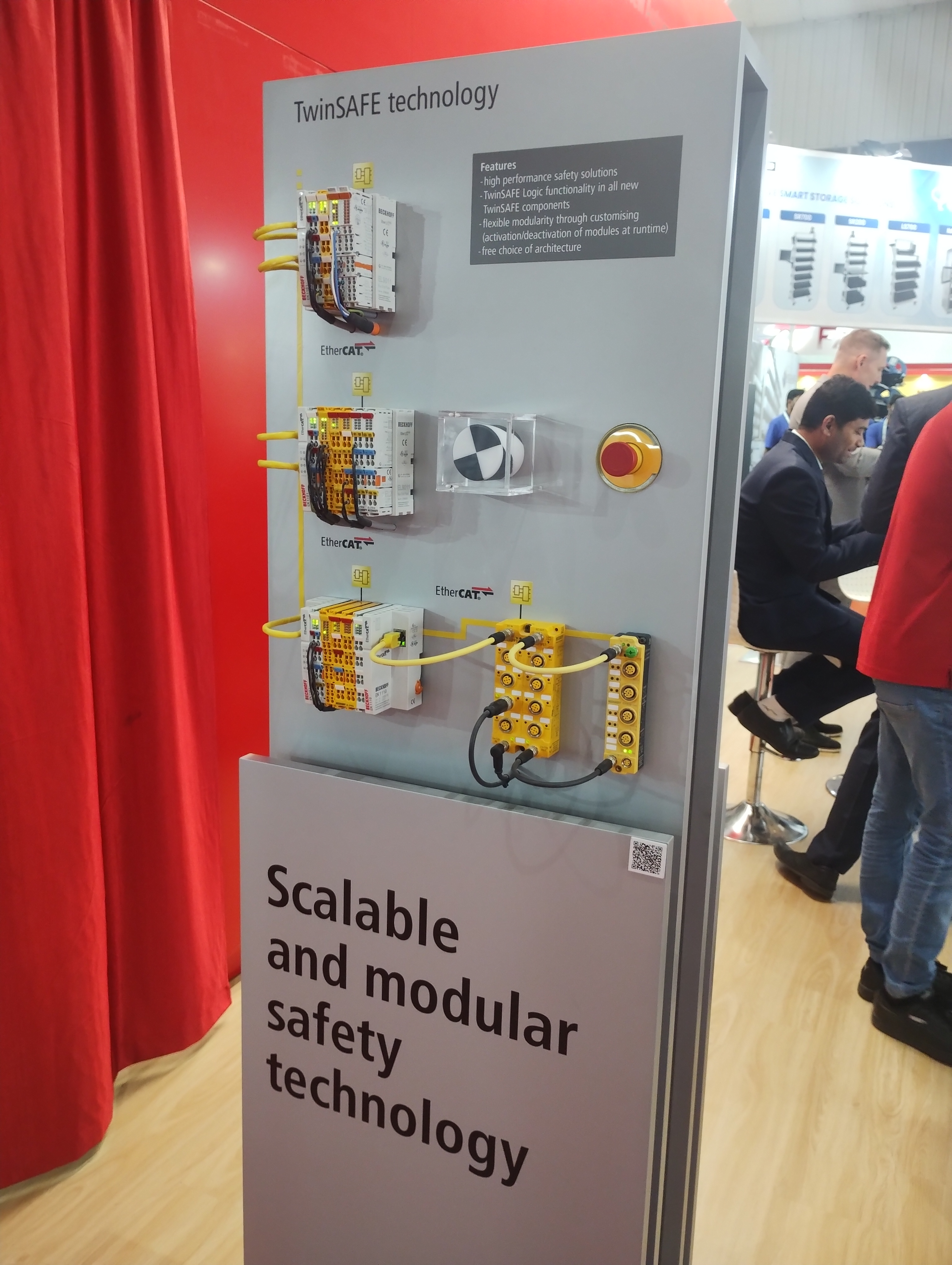
Beckhoff's EtherCAT TwinSAFE technology switches at Electronica 2025, BIEC

== History ==
In 1980, Hans Beckhoff laid the foundation for Beckhoff Automation GmbH & Co. KG. Immediately after completing his studies in 1980, the physics graduate began building control cabinets and developing microprocessor‑based industrial electronics in the garage of his parents’ electrical business, Elektro‑Beckhoff. This became the Beckhoff Industrial Electronics division, the third business unit of the Beckhoff Group. In 1981, his father, company founder Arnold Beckhoff, died at the age of 56. His widow, Elisabeth Beckhoff, subsequently transferred the company to their four children Hans, Arnold, Marlies, and Michael.

In 2005, Elektro Beckhoff GmbH was split into three independent companies: Elektro Beckhoff (building electrical installation), Beckhoff Technik und Design GmbH (electrical retail), and Beckhoff Automation GmbH (automation technology). These three companies form today’s Beckhoff Group.

== PC-based control technology ==
As early as 1986, Beckhoff chose the personal computer as the hardware platform for control systems due to its stability and performance. PC technology, which has continued to evolve rapidly, has proven to be reliable and robust with largely unchanged architectural components since 1986.

A control system requires industrial‑grade hardware as well as an operating system, similar to IT applications. In the early years, Microsoft DOS was used. With extensions developed by Beckhoff, real‑time capability was ensured. This made it possible as early as 1986 to run PLC and Motion control applications together with visualization on a single PC.

With the introduction of the TwinCAT automation software in 1996, the system was switched to Windows, which remains the basis today. As a pioneer of PC‑based automation, Beckhoff has introduced many milestones, such as the first bus terminal in 1995, developed together with WAGO.

In 2003, Beckhoff invented the Industrial Ethernet technology EtherCAT, a real‑time Ethernet fieldbus for industrial automation. The EtherCAT Technology Group (ETG), founded the same year, made the technology available to device manufacturers worldwide. EtherCAT has been an international IEC standard since 2007.

== Standardization of data exchange ==
The company advocates for standardized data exchange in production environments. Beckhoff’s PC‑based control technology is designed as an open system, allowing third‑party components to be integrated and enabling systems from different manufacturers to work together.

== Research and development ==
Beckhoff Automation continuously invests in research and development of new products and technologies. It was one of 27 core companies in the BMBF excellence cluster “Intelligent Technical Systems OstWestfalenLippe (it’s OWL)”. The cluster was awarded by the Federal Ministry of Education and Research as part of the German government's High-tech strategy and develops solutions for Industry 4.0.
