= Projectile =

Object propelled through the air

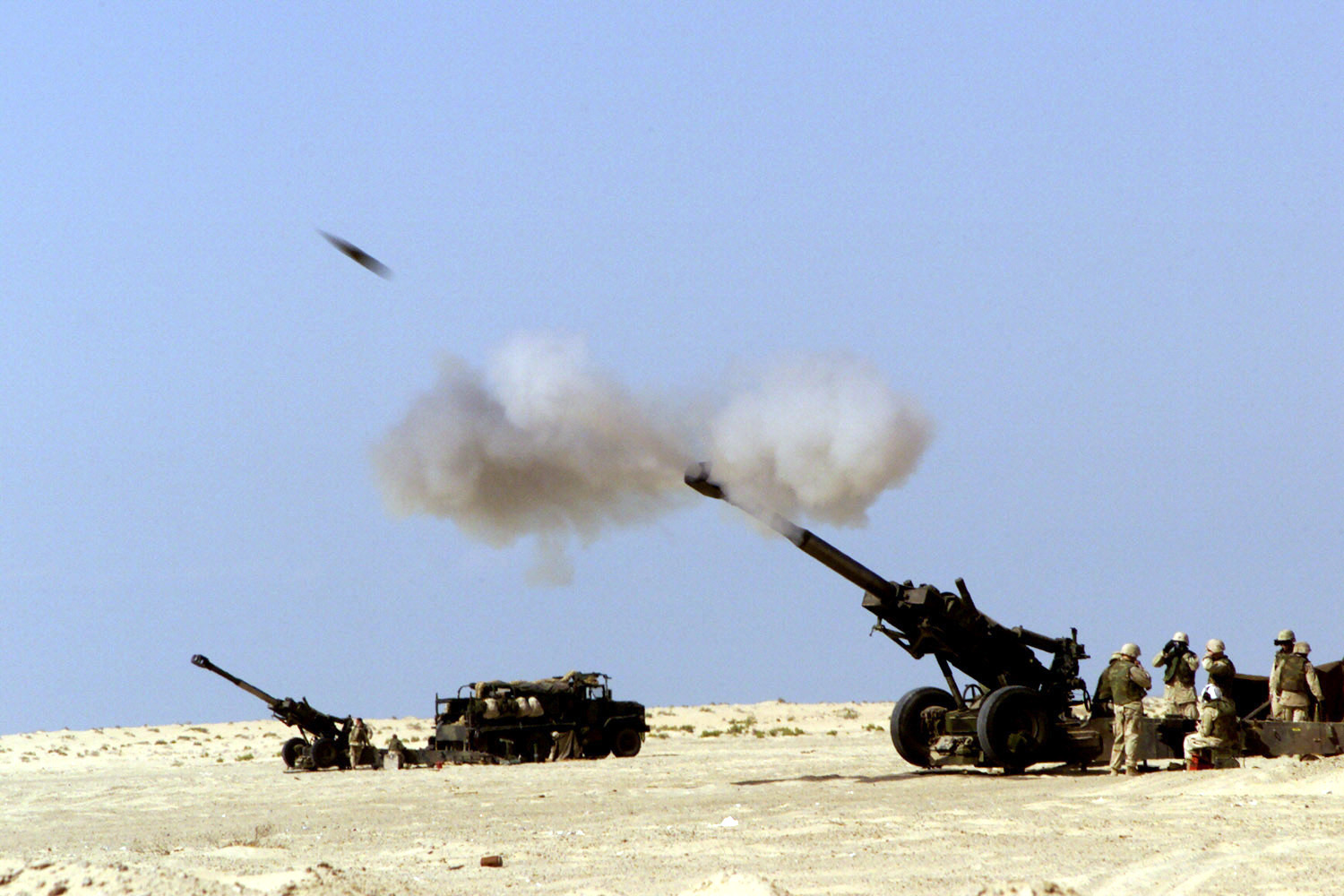
A projectile being fired from artillery

A projectile is launched by the application of an external force and then moves freely under the influence of gravity and air resistance. Although any objects in motion through space are projectiles, they are commonly found in warfare and sports (for example, a thrown baseball, kicked football, fired bullet, shot arrow, a ball from a cannon, stone released from catapult, etc.).

In ballistics, mathematical equations of motion are used to analyze projectile trajectories through launch, flight, and impact.

== Motive force ==
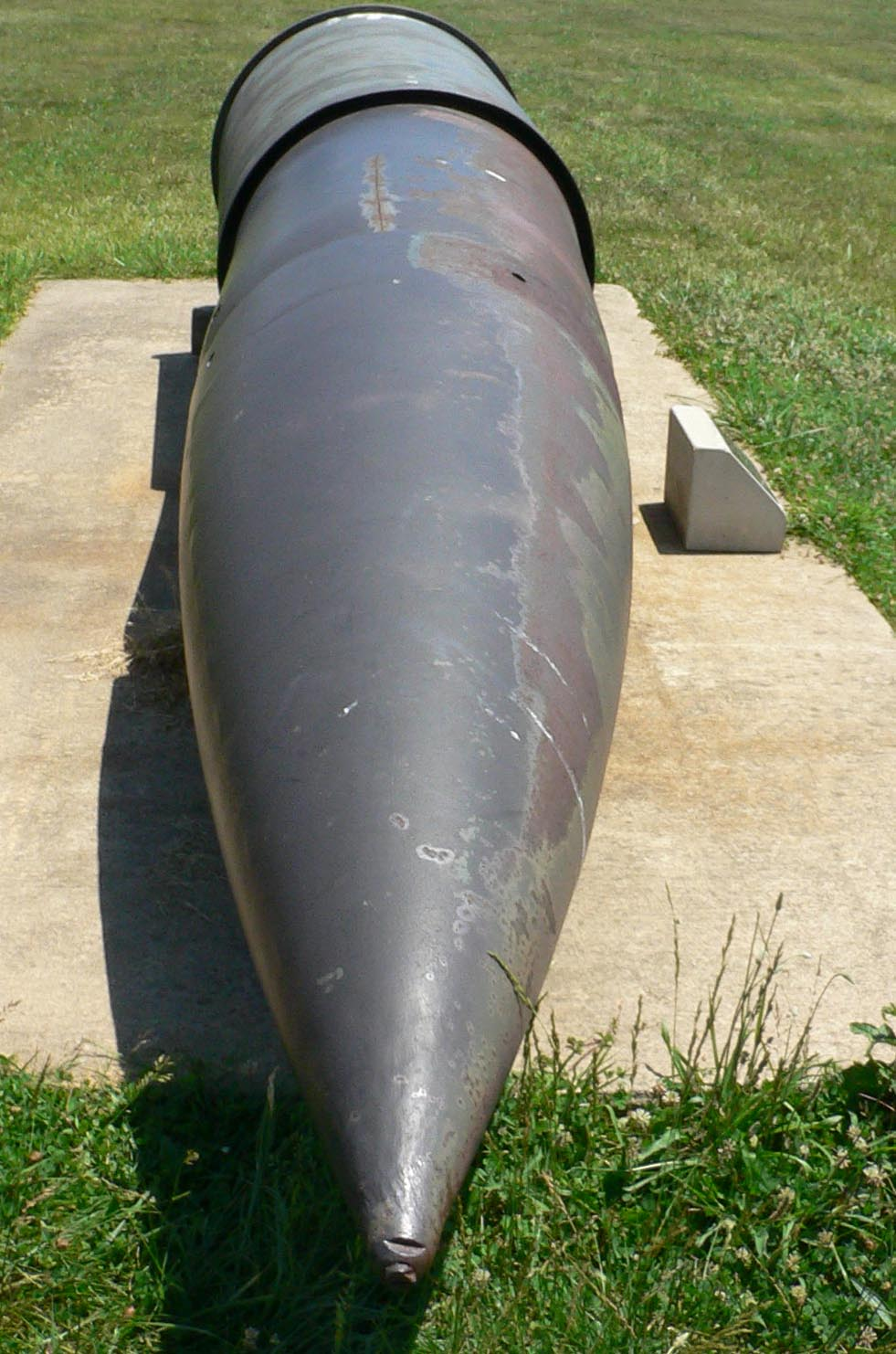
Projectile and cartridge case for the huge World War II Schwerer Gustav artillery piece. The majority of projectile weapons use the compression or expansion of gases as their motive force.

Blowguns and pneumatic rifles use compressed gases, while most other guns and cannons utilize expanding gases liberated by sudden chemical reactions by propellants like smokeless powder. Light-gas guns use a combination of these mechanisms.

Railguns utilize electromagnetic fields to provide acceleration along the entire length of the device, greatly increasing the muzzle velocity.

Some projectiles provide propulsion during flight by means of a rocket engine or jet engine. In military terminology, a rocket is unguided, while a missile is guided. Note the two meanings of "rocket" (weapon and engine): an ICBM is a guided missile with a rocket engine.

An explosion, whether or not by a weapon, causes the debris to act as multiple high velocity projectiles. An explosive weapon or device may also be designed to produce numerous high velocity projectiles by the break-up of its casing; these are correctly termed fragments.

== In sports ==
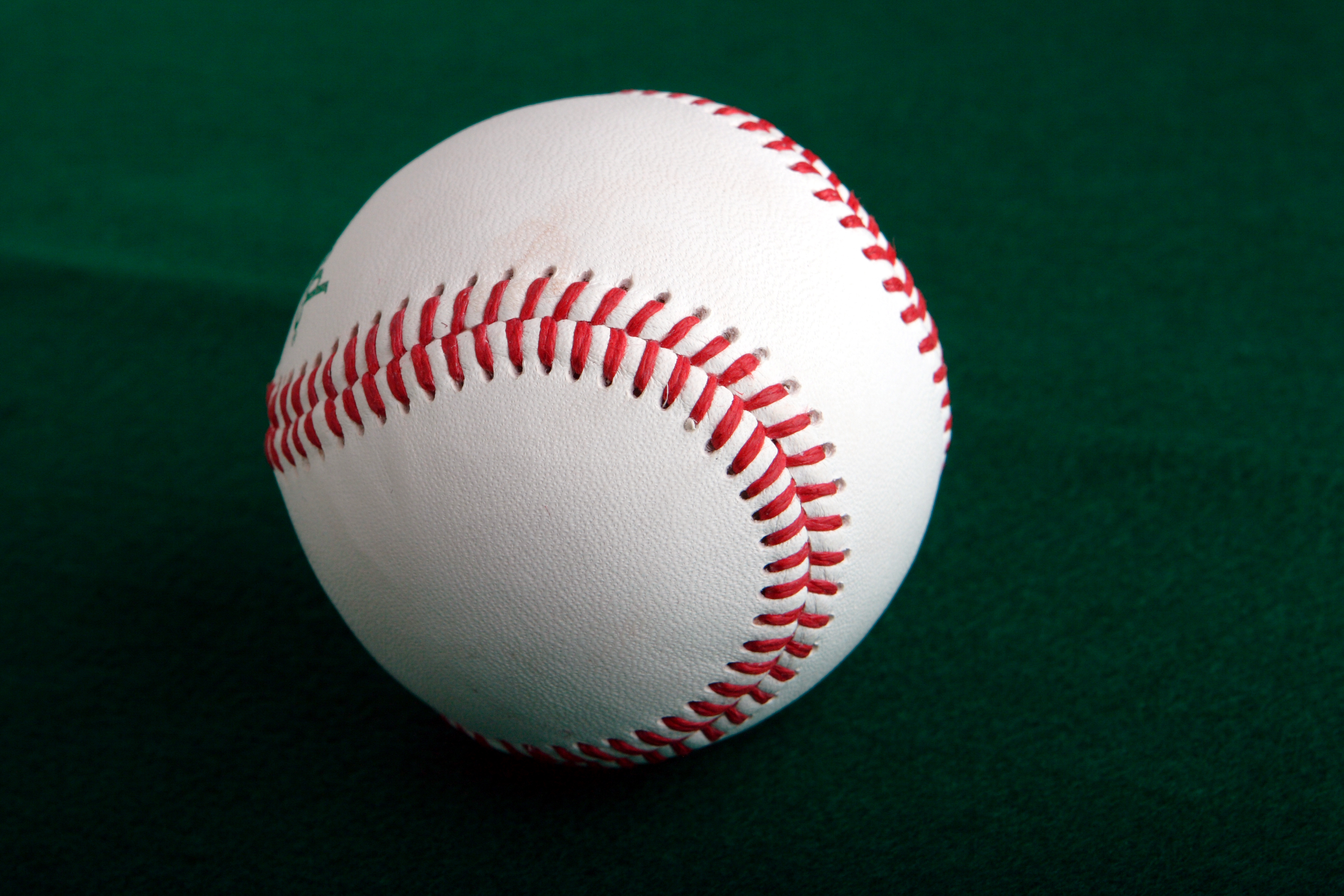
Ball speeds of 105 miles per hour (169 km/h) have been recorded in baseball.

In projectile motion, the most important force applied to the projectile mass is the propelling force. In many sports, the propelling forces are provided by muscles that accelerate the projectile (ball, disc, javelin, hammer, dart), and the stronger the propelling force, the faster and further the projectile will travel. See pitching, bowling.

== As a weapon ==
=== Delivery projectiles ===
Many projectiles, e.g. shells, may carry an explosive charge or another chemical or biological substance. Aside from explosive payload, a projectile can be designed to cause special damage, e.g. fire (see also early thermal weapons), or poisoning (see also arrow poison).

=== Kinetic projectiles ===
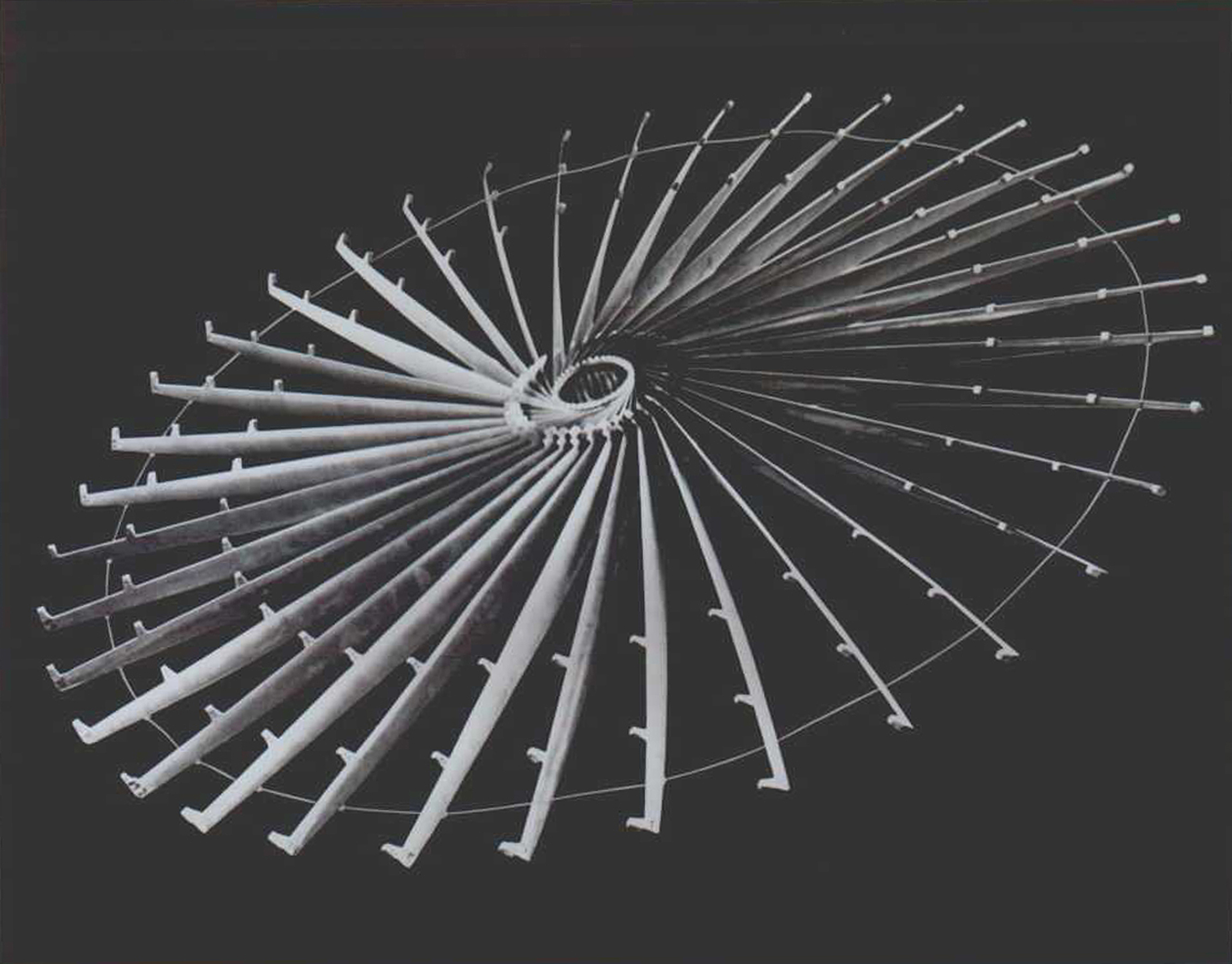
The Homing Overlay Experiment used a metal fan that was rolled up during launch and expanded during flight. The metal has five times as much destructive power as an explosive warhead of the same weight.

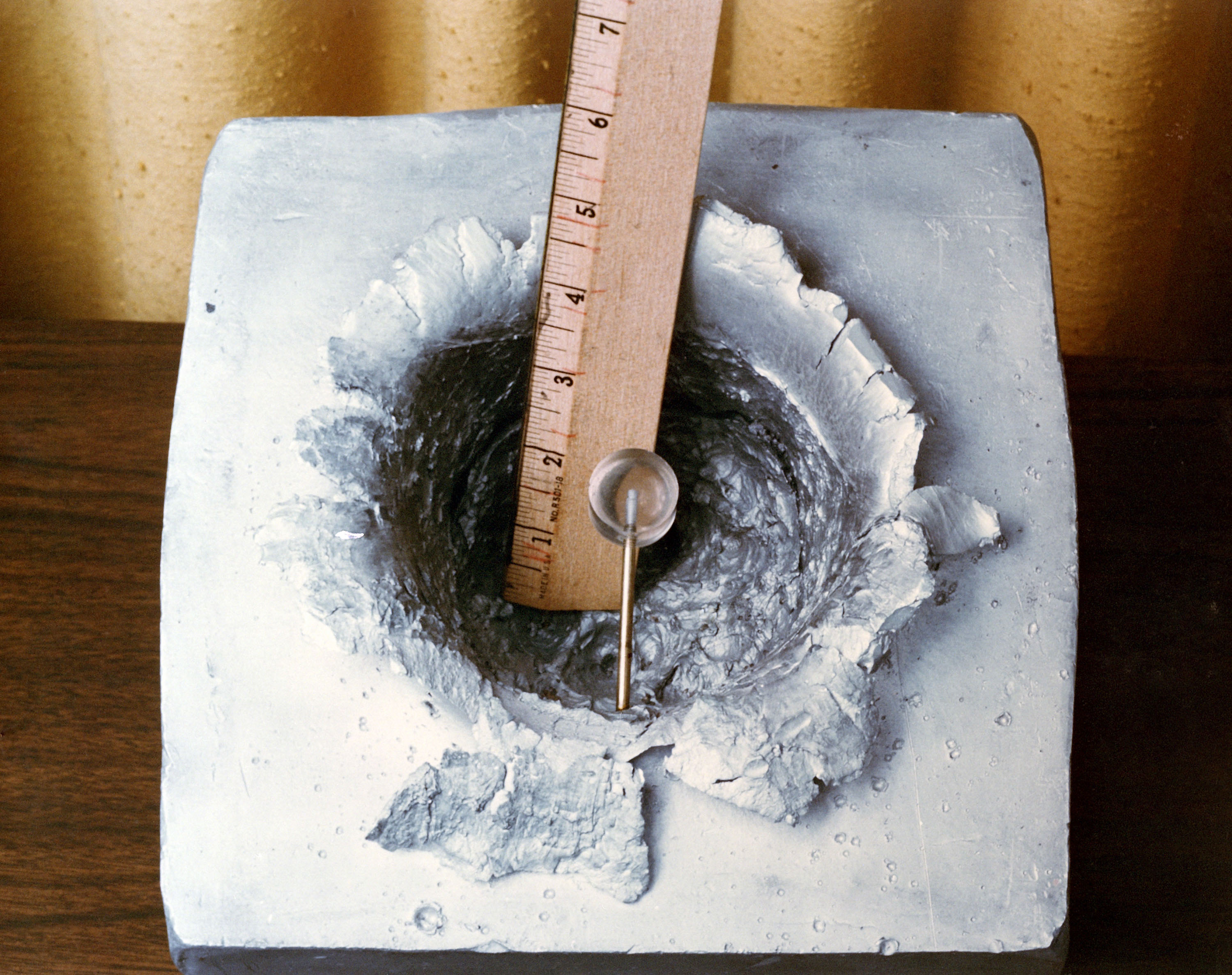
Sample from a kinetic energy weapon test. A piece of polycarbonate plastic weighing 7 grams (1/4 oz) was fired at an aluminium block at 7 km/s (23,000 ft/s), giving it a muzzle energy of 171,500 J (126,500 ft⋅lbf); a typical rifle bullet has a muzzle energy in the range of a few thousand joules, with the anti materiel .50 BMG reaching 20,000 J (15,000 ft⋅lbf).

A kinetic energy weapon (also known as kinetic weapon, kinetic energy warhead, kinetic warhead, kinetic projectile, kinetic kill vehicle) is a projectile weapon based solely on a projectile's kinetic energy to inflict damage to a target, instead of using any explosive, incendiary, chemical or radiological payload. All kinetic weapons work by attaining a high flight speed – generally supersonic or even up to hypervelocity – and collide with their targets, converting their kinetic energy and relative impulse into destructive shock waves, heat and cavitation. In kinetic weapons with unpowered flight, the muzzle velocity or launch velocity often determines the effective range and potential damage of the kinetic projectile.

Kinetic weapons are the oldest and most common ranged weapons used in human history, with the projectiles varying from blunt projectiles such as rocks and round shots, pointed missiles such as arrows, bolts, darts, and javelins, to modern tapered high-velocity impactors such as bullets, flechettes, and penetrators. Typical kinetic weapons accelerate their projectiles mechanically (by muscle power, mechanical advantage devices, elastic energy or pneumatics) or chemically (by propellant combustion, as with firearms), but newer technologies are enabling the development of potential weapons using electromagnetically launched projectiles, such as railguns, coilguns and mass drivers. There are also concept weapons that are accelerated by gravity, as in the case of kinetic bombardment weapons designed for space warfare.

The term hit-to-kill, or kinetic kill, is also used in the military aerospace field to describe kinetic energy weapons accelerated by a rocket engine. It has been used primarily in the anti-ballistic missile (ABM) and anti-satellite weapon (ASAT) fields, but some modern anti-aircraft missiles are also kinetic kill vehicles. Hit-to-kill systems are part of the wider class of kinetic projectiles, a class that has widespread use in the anti-tank field.

== Wired projectiles ==
Some projectiles stay connected by a cable to the launch equipment after launching it:

- for guidance: wire-guided missile (range up to 4,000 metres or 13,000 feet)
- to administer an electric shock, as in the case of a Taser (range up to 10.6 metres or 35 feet); two projectiles are shot simultaneously, each with a cable.
- to make a connection with the target, either to tow it towards the launcher, as with a whaling harpoon, or to draw the launcher to the target, as a grappling hook does.

== Equations of motion ==
An object projected at an angle to the horizontal has both the vertical and horizontal components of velocity. The vertical component of the velocity on the y-axis is given as $V_y=U\sin\theta$ while the horizontal component of the velocity is $V_x=U\cos\theta$. There are various calculations for projectiles at a specific angle $\theta$:

1. Time to reach maximum height. It is symbolized as ($t$), which is the time taken for the projectile to reach the maximum height from the plane of projection. Mathematically, it is given as $t=U \sin\theta/g$ where $g$ = acceleration due to gravity (app 9.81 m/s²), $U$ = initial velocity (m/s) and $\theta$ = angle made by the projectile with the horizontal axis.

2. Time of flight ($T$): this is the total time taken for the projectile to fall back to the same plane from which it was projected. Mathematically it is given as $T=2U\sin\theta/g$.

3. Maximum Height ($H$): this is the maximum height attained by the projectile OR the maximum displacement on the vertical axis (y-axis) covered by the projectile. It is given as $H = U^2 \sin^2\theta/2g$.

4. Range ($R$): The Range of a projectile is the horizontal distance covered (on the x-axis) by the projectile. Mathematically, $R = U^2 \sin 2\theta/g$. The Range is maximum when angle $\theta$ = 45°, i.e. $\sin 2\theta=1$.

== See also ==
- Projectile use by non-human organisms
- Traveling charge
