= SERCOS interface =

Communications protocol

- Sercos automation bus
- Year created: 1987
- Created by: VDW/ZVEI Joint Committee
- Governing Body: sercos International e.V.
- Website: http://www.sercos.org

In the field of Industrial Control Systems, the interfacing of various control components must provide means to coordinate the signals and commands sent between control modules. While tight coordination is desirable for discrete inputs and outputs, it is especially important in motion controls, where directing the movement of individual axes of motion must be precisely coordinated so that the motion of the entire system follows a desired path. Types of equipment requiring such coordination include metal cutting machine tools, metal forming equipment, assembly machinery, packaging machinery, robotics, printing machinery and material handling equipment. The Sercos (serial real-time communication system) interface is a globally standardized open digital interface for the communication between industrial controls, motion devices (drives) and input output devices (I/O). Sercos I and II are standardized in IEC 61491 and EN 61491. Sercos III is specified in standards IEC 61800-7; IEC 61784-1, -2, -3 and IEC 61158. Sercos is designed to provide hard real-time, high performance communications between industrial motion controls and digital servo drives.

== History ==
Until the early 1980s the majority of servo drive systems used to control motion in industrial machinery were based upon analog electronics. The accepted interface to control such devices was an analog voltage signal, where polarity represented the desired direction of motion, and magnitude represented the desired speed or torque. In the 1980s, drive systems and devices based on digital technology began to emerge. A new method needed to be devised to communicate with, and control such units, as their capabilities could not be exploited with the traditional interface method used with analog drives. The earliest interfaces were either proprietary to one vendor or designed only for a single purpose, making it difficult for users of motion control systems to freely interchange motion control and drives. The membership of the VDW (German Machine Tool Builders' Association) became concerned with the implications of this trend. In response to that, in 1987 the VDW formed a joint working group with the ZVEI (German Electrical and Electronics Industry Association) to develop an open interface specification appropriate for digital-drive systems. The resulting specification, entitled "Sercos (serial real-time communication system) interface, was released and later submitted to the IEC, which in 1995 released it as IEC 61491. After the release of the original standard, original working group member companies including ABB, AEG, AMK, Robert Bosch, Indramat, and Siemens founded the "Interest Group Sercos" to steward the standard. Over the history of Sercos, its capabilities have been enhanced to the point where today it is not only used for motion control systems, but as a universal automation bus.

== Versions ==
Sercos I was released in 1991. The transmission medium used is optical fiber. The data rates supported are 2 and 4 Mbit/s, and cyclic update rates as low as 62.5 microseconds. A ring topology is used. Sercos I also supports a "Service Channel" which allows asynchronous communication with slaves for less time-critical data.

Sercos II was introduced in 1999. It expanded the data rates supported to 2, 4, 8 and 16 Mbit/s.

Sercos III was introduced in 2003. It merges the hard-real-time aspects of Sercos with the Ethernet standard.

== Features of Sercos Automation Bus ==
Important features of Sercos include:

- Collision-free communication through the use of a time-slot mechanism.
- Highly efficient communication protocol (little overhead).
- Extremely low telegram jitter (specified at less than 1 microsecond, in practice as low as 35 nanoseconds).
- Highly developed standardized profiles agreed upon by multi-vendor technical working groups for dependable interoperability of devices from different manufacturers.
- Ability to control, for example, 60 axes of motion at an update of 250 microseconds for each and every drive (Sercos III).

== Support ==
Sercos is supported globally by Sercos International e.V. (SI) in Germany. Regional support is provided by Sercos North America(USA), Sercos Japan and Sercos China. These organizations provide a forum for the continued development of the standard, as well as user support.

== Conformance testing and interoperability ==
An important aspect of an open, interoperable communications system is rigorous testing of products for adherence to the standard and their ability to operate in networks of products from multiple vendors. Sercos International e.V. supports a Conformance Laboratory at the University of Stuttgart's Institute for Control Engineering of Machine Tools and Manufacturing Units (ISW). Products successfully passing conformance testing may display a mark indicating they are conformance tested. Conformance-tested Sercos I and II products are publicized in an index of certified products, Sercos I and II. Conformance-tested Sercos III products are publicized in an index of certified products, Sercos III.
