= John Kenneth Salisbury Jr. =

Roboticist and Research Professor Emeritus

J. Kenneth Salisbury, Jr.
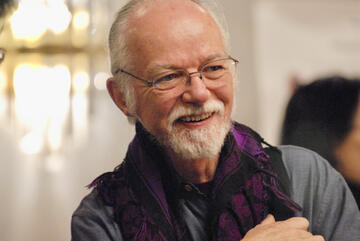
- Born: July 12, 1951 (age 75); Schenectady, New York, USA

Academic background
- Education: Stanford University

Academic work
- Institutions: Stanford University; Massachusetts Institute of Technology; Intuitive Surgical
- Main interests: Robotics; Haptics; Medical Robotics

John Kenneth Salisbury, Jr. (born July 12, 1951, in Schenectady, New York) is an American Roboticist and Research Professor Emeritus at Stanford University’s Computer Science Department and Stanford School of Medicine’s Department of Surgery. Salisbury is a researcher in the fields of robotics, haptics, and medical robotics. Widely known as the father of haptics, he is an inventor of over 50 patents and recipient of the 2011 IEEE Inaba Award for "Commercialization of Products in Medical Robotics, Robotics, and Haptics".

== Academic background ==
Kenneth Salisbury received his Bachelor of Science (1975), Master of Science (1977), and PhD (1982) at Stanford University. His PhD thesis, Kinematic and Force Analysis of Articulated Hands was advised by Professor Bernard Roth. He is an academic descendant of the Father of Modern Kinematics, Ferdinand Freudenstein.

From 1982 through 1997, Salisbury served as Principal Research Scientist at the Massachusetts Institute of Technology’s Artificial Intelligence Laboratory. From 1997 through 2003, he was Fellow and Scientific Advisor at Intuitive Surgical in Mountain View, CA. He joined the faculty at Stanford in 1999 where his research has focused on the design of robots for interaction with and near humans as well as haptics and surgical simulation. He became Professor Emeritus in 2017.

== Work ==
Salisbury's work is organized around the following topics:

- Robot Hands:multi-finger hand mechanisms, control systems and perception techniques
- Haptics: interfaces and rendering techniques
- Robot Arms:force controllable robotic arms
- Personal Robotics: robots to work near and with humans, HRI
- Medical Robotics: user interfaces and surgical simulation

== Selected references ==
- Salisbury, J.K., Jr. (1999). Making graphics physically tangible. Communications of the ACM (Vol. 42, Number 8), pp. 74–81.
- Salisbury, J.K., Jr. & Craig, J. J. (1982). Articulated Hands: Force Control and Kinematic Issues. International Journal of Robotics Research, 1(1). Massachusetts Institute of Technology.
- Mason, M.T. and J.K. Salisbury, Robot Hands and the Mechanics of Manipulation, M.I.T. Press, Cambridge, MA, 1985

== Awards ==
- IEEE Inaba Technical Award for Innovation Leading to Production for Feb 2011, Contributions to Commercialization of Products in Medical Robotics, Robotics and Haptics.
- 2022 IEEE Pioneer in Robotics and Automation Award "For pioneering contributions to the field of robot mechanics, mechanism design and surgical manipulation".
