= Bruno Siciliano (engineer) =

Italian control engineer and roboticist

Bruno Siciliano (Naples, 27 October 1959) is an Italian engineer, academic and scientific popularizer. He is professor of Control and Robotics at the University of Naples Federico II, Chair of the Scientific Council of the ICAROS Center, and Director of the PRISMA Lab at the Department of Electrical Engineering and Information Technology. He is also Honorary Professor at the university of Óbuda where he holds the Rudolf Kálmán chair.

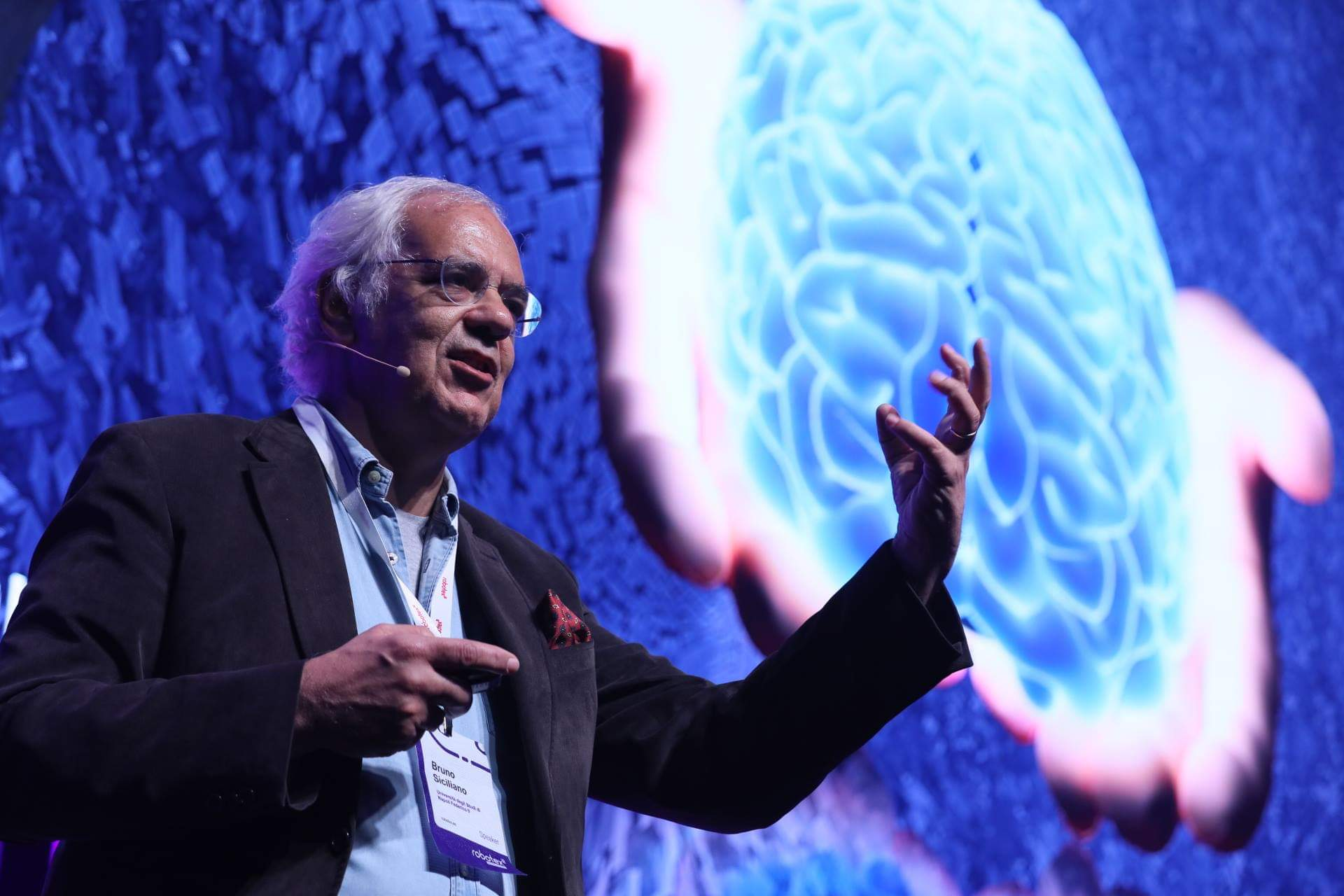
Siciliano in 2018.

== Education and career ==
In 1982, Siciliano graduated in Electronic Engineering from the University of Naples Federico II, where he then obtained a PhD in Electronic and Computer Engineering in 1987. Fascinated by the readings of Isaac Asimov's books on science fiction and cybernetics, he decided to approach robotics in terms of research. From September 1985 to June 1986, he was a visiting scholar at the George W. Woodruff School of Mechanical Engineering of the Georgia Institute of Technology.

Siciliano became an assistant professor of Automatic Control in 1989 at the Department of Computer and Systems Engineering of the University of Naples and then an associate professor in 1992. He moved to the role of full professor in 2000 for the Department of Electronic and Computer Engineering of the University of Salerno. Since 2003, he has been a full professor of Automatic Control at the Department of Computer and Systems Engineering, which later became the Department of Electrical Engineering and Information Technology.

Since 2016, he has been Honorary Professor of the University of Óbuda from which he received the chair named after Rudolf Emil Kálmán in 2019.

Siciliano was President of the IEEE Robotics and Automation Society from 2008 to 2009. From 2013 to 2021, he was a member of the Board of Directors of the European Robotics Association. In 2019, he was among the founding members of the National Institute for Robotics and Intelligent Machines (I-RIM). He is a member of the I-RIM Board of Directors. Since 2020, he has been on the Board of the International Foundation of Robotics Research. Since 2020, he has been an IFAC Pavel J. Nowacki Distinguished Lecturer. In 2025, Siciliano was appointed as a member of the Technical-Scientific Committee of the National Cybersecurity Agency (ACN).

== Research ==
Siciliano's research concerns the manipulation and control of robots, cooperation between robots and humans and service robotics. He was Director of ICAROS, the Interdepartmental Center for Robotic Surgery, which aims to create synergies between clinical and surgical practice and research on new technologies for computer/robot-assisted surgery. He directs PRISMA Lab, the Laboratory of Projects of Industrial and Service Robotics, Mechatronics and Automation in the Department of Electrical Engineering and Information Technology (DIETI) of the University of Naples Federico II. He is a member of the Board of Directors of the Research Consortium for Energy, Automation and Electromagnetic Technologies (CREATE) where he is responsible for the research program in Robotics.

Among his research projects are EndoTheranostics and RoDyMan, both funded by the European Research Council through a Synergy Grant and an Advanced Grant, respectively.

EndoTheranostics (Multi-sensor Eversion Robot Towards Intelligent Endoscopic Diagnosis and Therapy, 2024–2030) aims to revolutionise the diagnosis and treatment of colorectal cancer. The project is based on the use of a soft robot capable of deeply exploring the colon, collecting information through advanced sensors, and supporting targeted clinical interventions. The robot also serves as a conduit for transporting miniaturised instruments to the treatment site, thereby enabling combined diagnostic and therapeutic procedures (theranostics).

RoDyMan (Robotic Dynamic Manipulation, 2013–2019) a robot designed to replicate the movements of a pizzaiolo. From a scientific research perspective, it addressed the challenge of creating an automaton capable of manipulating deformable and elastic objects, such as dough made of water and flour. Siciliano has been the coordinator of several projects funded by the European Commission: REFILLS (Robotics Enabling Fully-Integrated Logistics Lines for Supermarkets, 2017–2020) a project aimed at the realization of mobile assistance cobots in supermarkets, EuRoC (European Robotics Challenges, 2014–2018), the largest research program in Europe on robotics competitions, DEXMART (DEXterous and Autonomous Dual-Arm / Hand Robotic Manipulation with sMART Sensory-Motor Skills: A Bridge from Natural to Artificial Cognition, 2008–2012) one of the first European projects on bimanual manipulation. He also co-coordinated ECHORD (European Clearing House for Open Robotics Development, 2009–2013), a pilot project for technology transfer from research laboratories to SMEs.

== Educator ==
Siciliano is active on the MOOC front of the e-learning platform of the University of Naples Federico II with his two Robotics Foundations I & II courses associated with the contents of his textbook, also available on the edX platform, and participation in Industry 4.0 courses, on enabling technologies underlying the new 4.0 paradigm and Pizza Revolution for research and studies on robotics applied to the art of making pizza.

"Keep the gradient" is the motto that Siciliano invented and means the constant search for new ideas and new solutions: a hymn to complexity to seize challenges and opportunities always under the banner of the art of "work and play" as he stated in his TEDx talk in 2016.

== Publications ==
In 2008 with Oussama Khatib of Stanford University, Siciliano published the Springer Handbook of Robotics (ISBN 9783540239574), which received the PROSE Award from the American Association of Publishers for Excellence in Physical Sciences & Mathematics. A text that is the result of the coordination work of over 200 world-renowned researchers with the aim of combining the manual dimension with the encyclopedic one. With the second edition of 2016 (ISBN 9783319325521), the book was among the first to have a multimedia support for direct viewing of videos within the text.

In 2009 with Lorenzo Sciavicco, Luigi Villani and Giuseppe Oriolo he published Robotics, Modeling, Planning and Control (ISBN 9781846286421), a textbook by Springer now in its third edition and translated into Chinese (ISBN 9787560557847), Greek (ISBN 9789603307488) and Italian (ISBN 9788838663222).

== Awards ==
Siciliano received the IEEE RAS Pioneer in Robotics and Automation Award "for fundamental contributions to robotics research in the areas of manipulation and control, human–robot cooperation, and service robotics" (2024, the Engelberger Award for Education "for contributing to the advancement of the Science of Robotics in the Service of Mankind" (2022). He was awarded the IEEE RAS George Saridis Leadership Award in Robotics and Automation "for his outstanding leadership in the robotics and automation community as a research innovator, an inspired educator, a dedicated contributor of professional service, an ambassador of science and technology" (2015) and the IEEE RAS Distinguished Service Award "for outstanding leadership and commitment in promoting robotics and automation and RAS as the number one Society in the field" (2010). He has also won the Guido Dorso Award for the university section (2015) and the IPE Alumni Award (2008).

Siciliano ranks tenth (second among engineers) on the list of the 90 most influential scientists of the University of Naples Federico II.

== Personal life ==
Siciliano is married, with two sons and a daughter.

== Bibliography ==
- (EN) From Pizza Making to Human Care, Springer Nature storytelling project "Before the Abstract", 10 July 2018
- (IT) Conferimento del Premio Guido Dorso, Palazzo Giustiniani, Roma, 15 October 2015
- (EN) Oral Histories: Bruno Siciliano, Robotics History: Narratives and Networks, IEEE TV, 4 May 2015
- (IT) I nipoti di Galileo, Pietro Greco, Baldini Castoldi Dalai Editore, ISBN 978-88-6620-071-0, 2011
- (EN) In the Spotlight: Prof. Bruno Siciliano, Springer Author Zone, January 2011
