= SERCOS III =

Communications protocol

Logo

Sercos III is the third generation of the Sercos interface, a standardized open digital interface for the communication between industrial controls, motion devices, input/output devices (I/O), and Ethernet nodes, such as PCs. Sercos III applies the hard real-time features of the Sercos interface to Ethernet. It is based upon the Ethernet standard (IEEE 802.3 and ISO/IEC 8802-3). Work began on Sercos III in 2003, with vendors releasing first products supporting it in 2005.

== General architecture ==
To achieve the throughput and jitter requirements in Sercos applications, Sercos III operates primarily in a Master/Slave arrangement exchanging cyclic data between nodes. The master initiates all data transmission during a Sercos real-time cycle. All data transmissions begin and end at the master (circular).

=== Sercos III cycle ===
The basic Sercos III cycle

Communication across a Sercos III network occurs in strict cyclic intervals. A cycle time is chosen by the user for a given application, ranging from 31.25 μs to 65 ms. Within each cycle, data is exchanged between Sercos III nodes using two types of telegrams: MDTs and ATs (see Telegram Types). After all MDTs and ATs are transmitted, Sercos III nodes allow the remaining time in the cycle to be used as an UC (Unified Communication) Channel, which can be used to exchange data using other formats, such as IP.

The network remains available to UCC traffic until the next cycle begins, at which time Sercos III closes the nodes to UCC traffic again. This is an important distinction. Sercos is purposely designed to provide open access at all ports for other protocols between cyclic real-time messages. No tunneling is required. This provides the advantage that any Sercos III node is available, whether Sercos III is in cyclic mode or not, to use other protocols, such as TCP/IP, without any additional hardware to process tunneling. Sercos nodes are specified to provide a store and forward method of buffering non-Sercos messages should they be received at a node while cyclic communication is active.

=== Telegrams ===
Sercos III Telegram Structure

==== Telegram format ====
All Sercos III telegrams conform to the IEEE 802.3 and ISO/IEC 8802-3 MAC (media access control) frame format.

Destination address
The destination address for all Sercos III telegrams is always 0xFFFF FFFF FFFF (all 1s), which is defined as a broadcast address for Ethernet telegrams. This is because all telegrams are issued by the master, and are intended for all slaves on the network.

Source address
The source address for all Sercos III telegrams is the MAC address of the master, as it issues all telegrams.

Ethernet type
A unique EtherType value has been assigned via the IEEE EtherType Field Registration Authority for Sercos III (0x88CD).

Sercos III header
The beginning of an Ethernet-defined data field always begins with a Sercos III header, which contains control and status information unique to Sercos.

Sercos III data field
The Sercos III header is followed by the Sercos III data field, which contains a configurable set of variables defined for each device in the network.

==== Telegram types ====
Two main types of telegrams are used within the Sercos III Cycle. The Master Data Telegram (MDT) and the Acknowledge Telegram (AT). Both telegram types are issued by the master (control). The MDT contains information provided by the master to other devices. It is filled by the master and read by other devices. The AT is issued by the master but is populated by each other device with appropriate response data (feedback values, input states, etc.). More than one device uses the same AT, filling in its pre-determined area in the AT telegram, updating checksums, and then passing the telegram to the next device. This method reduces the Ethernet frame overhead's impact on the network's performance without compromising IEEE 802.3 and ISO/IEC 8802-3. The amount of data sent from the master to other devices and the sum of the data returned by the other devices may exceed the 802.3-specified maximum 1500-byte data field size. To comply with this limit, Sercos III may use more than one MDT telegram in a cycle and more than one AT telegram (up to 4 in each case).

Sercos III Synchronization

=== Synchronization ===
To achieve true hard real-time characteristics, Sercos III, like Sercos I and II, uses a form of synchronization that depends upon a synchronization “mark” issued by the master control at exact equidistant time intervals. All nodes in a Sercos network use this telegram to synchronize all activities in the node. To account for variations in network components, delays are measured in the node-to-node transmissions during the phase-up (initialization) of a Sercos network, and those values are compensated for during normal operation. Unlike Sercos I and II, where a separate Master Sync Telegram, or MST is used for this purpose, Sercos III includes the MST in the first MDT transmitted. No separate telegram is issued. The time between two MSTs is exactly equal to the designated Sercos cycle time, Stacy.

The synchronization process ensures that cyclical and simultaneous synchronization of all connected devices occurs independently of topology and the number of devices in Sercos networks.

Sercos III Physical Interface Nomenclature

=== Physical and data link layers ===
Sercos III supports standard IEEE 802.3 and ISO/IEC 8802-3 100BASE-TX or 100BASE-FX (100 Mbit/s baseband) full duplex physical layer (PHY) entities. 802.3-compliant Media-Access Controller (MAC) sub-layers are used. Auto-negotiation must be enabled on each PHY, but only 100 Mbit full duplex is supported. Auto (MAU [Media Attachment Unit]-Embedded) Crossover is specified between the two Physical Medium Attachment (PMA) units present with a duplex port. These two units are referred to as the Primary Channel and Secondary Channel in the Sercos III specification. Dual interfaces are required (two duplex interfaces per device). Within the Sercos III specification, the dual interfaces are referred to as P1 and P2 (Ports 1 and 2).

=== Wiring ===
Installing a Sercos network does not require infrastructure components such as switches or hubs, and all devices are interconnected by patch or crossover cables The Ethernet ports on the devices are interchangeable and can be used to connect standard Ethernet devices such as notebook computers to network. Every Ethernet and IP protocol on Sercos devices can be accessed without interfering with the real-time protocol and without requiring the real-time operation to be activated.

=== Sercos III stack ===
All of the functionality required to configure a Sercos III interface is contained in a stack that is available in both “hard” and “soft” versions. The hard version is widely used for embedded applications (such as drives, I/O modules, and micro-controller based motion control), where:

- It is important that the overhead of managing the Sercos III nodes not be placed upon the device processor.
- Nanosecond jitter is required.

The hardware stack is available in several different forms. These currently include:

- A bit stream for Xilinx FPGAs for master and slave
- A bit stream for Altera FPGAs for master and slave
- A bit stream for Lattice Semiconductor FPGAs for master and slave
- A Net list for Xilinx FPGAs for master and slave
- A Net list for Altera FPGAs for master and slave
- A Net list for Lattice FPGAs for master and slave
- The “netX” multi-network controller chip from Hilscher, GmbH for master and slave
- The Anybus CC module from HMS Industrial Networks for slave
- The Sitara™ AM335x microprocessors from Texas Instruments for master and slave.
- The Innovasic, Inc. fido 5000 REM Switch chip for slave.
- The RZ/N1 microprocessors from Renesas Electronics for slave.

The maximum jitter allowed with hard-stack-based masters and slaves is less than 1 μs. Using the above stacks yields a jitter similar to Sercos II (35-70 nanoseconds).

Sercos III also supports an operating system and hardware platform independent “Soft Master”, using a completely software-based stack for the master interface. Since the maximum jitter in such a configuration is dependent upon the operating system of the Master, the maximum jitter may be set by a variable for the Sercos III network when a Soft Master is employed. A standard Ethernet controller can be used for applications with line topology, bus cycle times greater than 500 us, and microsecond range synchronization. Applications with higher synchronization requirements and lower bus cycle times can be implemented using a TTS-capable Ethernet controller with a suitable real-time operating system.

For basic Slaves, such as I/O devices, EasySlave-IO, a license-free bitstream variant of the EasySlave is available.

A product that uses an Arduino board as a rapid prototype platform for an application, plus a corresponding shield (add-on module) with a Sercos EasySlave FPGA, plus other peripheral components, is available.

=== Data consistency ===
A term usually associated with the IT enterprise, data consistency can also apply to real-time control (see for example Peer to Peer Communication). For this reason, Sercos III specifies that no data be overwritten (destroyed) during a transmission. Every slave on a network may access input and output data for every other slave on the network.

=== Addressing ===
Devices must support Ethernet's MAC addressing, plus the Sercos III addressing. Other addressing schemes are optional.

Sercos III address
Each Sercos III device contains a numeric address used by other devices on the Sercos III network to exchange data. The address may be any whole integer from 1 to 511.

IP address
Sercos III does not use an IP address for its operation. Whether a device contains an IP address or not is dependent on its support of other specifications, either independent (exclusive) of Sercos III operation or via the UC (Unified Communication) Channel portion of the cycle.

=== Network topologies ===
The Sercos III specification defines two possible network topologies; Ring and Line. To those familiar with other networks, both of them may appear to be configured as a ring. All telegrams begin and end at the master. The Full Duplex feature of the physical layer is used to achieve this.

==== Line topology ====
Sercos III Line Topology

A line topology is the simplest of the two possible arrangements and provides no redundancy. However, this configuration saves the cost of one cable. In it, only one of the two interfaces on the master is used. Telegrams are issued out of the transmit PMA on the Master’s active port. Either port on the master may be the active one. Sercos III determines this during phase-up (initialization).

The first slave receives the telegrams on the connected interface's receive PMA, modifies them as required, and issues them out on the transmit PMA of the second interface. Each cascading Slave does likewise until the last Slave in the Line is reached. That slave, detecting no Sercos III connection on its second port, folds the telegram back on the receiving interface's transmit port. The telegram then makes its way through each Slave back to the Master. Note the last slave also emits all Sercos III telegrams on its second port, even though no Sercos III connection is detected. This is for snooping, ring closures (see below), and hot-plugging.

Keep in mind that since the Ethernet destination field in all Sercos III telegrams is the broadcast address of 0xFFFF FFFF FFFF (all 1s), all telegrams issued from this open port will be seen by other devices as broadcast telegrams. This behavior is by design, and cannot be disabled. To avoid taxing networks attached to an open Sercos port, an IP-Switch can be used, or alternately a managed Ethernet switch programmed to block broadcast telegrams received from the Sercos port can be used. Starting with Sercos III specification version 1.3.1 the connection of industrial Ethernet devices is supported where devices work with 20 ms cycle time in communication phase 0 (CP 0).

Sercos III Ring Topology

==== Ring topology ====
A ring topology simply closes the network by attaching the unused port on the last device in a ring back to the unused port on the Master. When the Sercos III Master senses that a ring exists, it sets up two counter-rotating telegrams. The same data is issued simultaneously out of the transmit PMAs of both ports on the Master. From there both telegrams are managed essentially identically as they make their way through each Slave, ending back at the opposite port on the Master they were emitted from. Advantages to this topology include tighter synchronization, as well as automatic infrastructure redundancy (see below).

==== Other network topologies ====
Sercos III operates in a “circular” approach with both the line or ring structure. All telegrams leave the master and return. As with any network that operates in this manner, modified structures can be constructed to appear as a tree or star network, utilizing hardware that manages the branches, but the structure is still circular.

=== Infrastructure hardware ===
Sercos III is designed in such a way that no additional network infrastructure (standard Ethernet switches, Hubs, etc.) is required to operate. Normal standard Ethernet (non-Sercos III capable) components may be placed within a Sercos III network, as their presence will not adversely affect the timing and synchronization of the network.

Guarantee synchronization in extended networks using media converters requires Cut-through switching. If ring redundancy shall be achieved, Link Loss Forwarding with appropriate reaction times is necessary.

=== Fieldbus integration ===
A variety of products is available that enable the connection of field buses (Profibus and CAN) or sensor/actuator buses (AS-i, SSI, IO-Link) to a Sercos network. Gateways are available to integrate analog axes. Gateways are incorporated into Sercos devices (e.g., modular I/Os) or are connected as separate components in the network.

== Features ==
In addition to the features of the Sercos interface, Sercos III also provides:

- Ethernet: Every Sercos device is a three-port switch and completely transparent for connected Standard Ethernet devices such as engineering systems, human-machine interfaces, etc. First of all, a Sercos device is an Ethernet device.
- Sercos is a deterministic Ethernet-based automation bus that uses a frame summation technique for highly efficient communication.
- Cyclic updates to devices are made at rates as low as 31.25 μs
- Support for up to 511 Slave devices on one network
- Redundancy: Bump-less physical layer single-fault recovery
- Detection of a dropped physical connection within 25 μs (less than one cycle update)
- Hot plugging: insertion & configuration of devices into the network while cyclic communication is active.
- Peer-to-peer communications: both controller-to-controller (C2C) for multiple masters to communicate with one another and direct cross-communication (CC) among multiple slave devices.

=== Application layer (profiles) ===
The Sercos III specification defines a broad range of variables developed by a consortium of product suppliers to provide interoperability between components (motion controls, drives, etc.). All traffic across a Sercos III network consists of Idents (parameters) with attributes. The idents define over 700 standardized parameters that describe the interaction between electric, pneumatic, and hydraulic control systems, drives, and other peripheral devices using universal semantics. This method was first defined in Sercos I, as an essentially flat set of idents. They were later grouped into application sets to aid in the selection of pertinent incidents required for a given industry, such as the “Pack Profile” for use with packaging machinery. During the development of the Sercos III specification, this methodology was further refined to group the incidents logically by device class. The definition of the legacy idents has remained largely untouched; rather their grouping has been re-evaluated for a more understandable architecture. This has also enabled the separation of communication idents into a logical subset, simplifying migration from Sercos I/II to Sercos III, and providing a clear overview to users.

Sercos III Redundancy healing a Ring Break

=== Redundancy ===
When a ring network is employed, Sercos III provides for automatic infrastructure redundancy. If any interconnection point in the ring ceases to function, the associated Sercos III nodes will detect a “ring break” and “loop back” the end nodes, effectively operating as two lines rather than one ring.

The operation is “bump-less”, as the detection and recovery time for such a break is less than 25 μs, which is less than the minimum Sercos III cycle time. Sercos III can also recover from ring breaks and “heal” with no interruption in operation. Since Sercos III telegrams continue to be emitted by transmit PMAs on unconnected ports and receive PMAs on unconnected ports continue to monitor for incoming data, when a Sercos III port recognizes that a ring has by physically re-closed, it will re-activate the counter-rotating telegrams to functionally close the rings again. This operation is also bump-less.

=== Peer communications ===
To ensure the determinism required, most real-time Ethernet standards enforce a master-to-slave-only method of communications. This can conflict with the need for a node in the system to exchange data efficiently with a node other than the network master. The conventional method to achieve this in a master-slave network is to pass data from one slave node to the master, where it is reissued to one or more different slaves. For example, if several servo drives on a network are to be synchronized to a signal from another drive on the network, the master must fetch the signal from this drive and reissue it to all other drives on the network. Disadvantages to this method are that delays are induced due to the multiple cycles required, and the master's processing load is increased as it must actively participate in the function, although it contributes nothing. Since no data is destroyed in a Sercos III telegram, data to and from any slave can be accessed by another node on the network without any additional cycle delay or master intervention. Additionally, as telegrams pass each node twice in a cycle (for both topology types), a node can even have the opportunity to access data supplied by a subsequent node. Two peer communication methods are defined in the Sercos III specification: Controller to Controller (C2C) for multiple masters to communicate with one another, and Cross Communication (CC) for multiple slaves.

=== Hot-plugging ===
Another feature of Sercos III is hot-plugging, which is the ability to add devices to an active network. Using the features described for redundancy, a network can detect when a new device is attached to an active network. Processes exist that configure the new device, and announce its availability to the master control. After that, the master control can select to make use of the new device based on the application currently running.

=== Oversampling and time stamping ===
Oversampling allows more than one nominal/actual value to be transmitted per cycle, increasing the delicate nature of process control in extremely critical applications, such as laser applications.

Time stamping transmits event-controlled results, such as specific measured data, and switches outputs independently from the cycle. This increases the stability of the process in complex processing solutions, such as those in the semiconductor industry.

=== Unified Communication (UC) Channel ===
The time between the end of the transmission of all Sercos III Real Time (RT) cyclic telegrams and the beginning of the next communication cycle is defined as the “Sercos III Unified Communication Channel” (UC Channel). During this period, the Sercos network is opened to allow transmission of Ethernet-compliant frames for other services and protocols. For example:

1. Web servers can be embedded in Sercos III-compliant devices to respond to standard Hypertext Transfer Protocol (HTTP) messages received via the UC Channel.
2. Frames from other Fieldbus standards that conform to Ethernet frame formatting may be transmitted across a Sercos III network.

Every Sercos III-compliant node must support the passing of UC frames through its Sercos III interface. Whether a Sercos III node actively uses the UC feature is determined by the product's feature set. If, for example, the device has an embedded web server, it could make available its IP address for access by other devices.

A Sercos III network will always pass UC frames, even when the cyclic operation has not been initialized. This means that devices always have access to the network for UC messages, as long as the ports are powered.

UC Channel

Sercos III does not define whether a port should operate in cut-through switching or store-and-forward mode when handling UC frames. There are Sercos III products currently on the market that support both modes. Likewise, Sercos III does not define whether a port should intelligently process UC telegrams, such as learning the network topology.

The time allotted for UC traffic is dictated by the amount of data transmitted during the real-time portion of the cycle. In real-world applications, there is a significant amount of bandwidth available for UC frames. For example, in a typical application with 8 axes of motion and a cycle rate of 250 μs, the equivalent of 85 Mbit/s is available for UC use. This amount of time means the UC frames in this example can be as long as the maximum defined for Ethernet (Maximum Transmission Unit [MTU] =1500). Using the same example of 8 axes but with a cycle time of 62.5 μs, the effective bandwidth available for UC frames would be 40 Mbit/s and the MTU would be reduced to 325. As with any network where time on the bus is shared, MTU values should be configured to ensure reliable communication. Properly configured Sercos networks will set the Sercos parameter “Requested MTU” (S-0-1027.0.1) to the recommended MTU value, which can then be read by other devices to match their MTU settings. Regardless of the value of this parameter, a Sercos node will allow non-Sercos traffic to pass for the entire UC channel period (i.e., telegrams longer than the MTU setting are not discarded by the Sercos stack). Sercos parameter S-0-1027.0.1 is set by default to 576, the minimum value called out in RFC 791.

UC Access via open port

UC Access via an IP-Switch

==== UCC access ====
UC frames may only enter a Sercos III network through a Sercos III-compliant port. This can be achieved in two different ways. One is to employ the unused Sercos III port at the end of a Sercos III network configured in line topology, as shown to the right.

In a network configured in a ring topology, the ring can be temporarily broken at any point to also attach a device. Since the redundancy feature of Sercos III will reconfigure the network in a bump-less manner (responding in less than one cycle), no disruption of network transmission will occur. The ring can again be closed after the access is no longer required.

If access is desired in the middle of a line topology (where no free ports are available), or it is undesirable to break a ring topology for extended periods, the Sercos III specification permits a device called an “IP-Switch” that can be used to provide access to the UC channel anywhere along the network. IP-Switches supply two Sercos III-compliant ports, and one or more ports for UCC access.

Commercially available UCC Switches block the transmission of Sercos III broadcast telegrams out their non-Sercos III port(s), to prevent flooding of non-Sercos III networks with Sercos III cyclic data.

=== Common network protocol ===
Sercos III is designed so that EtherNet/IP. TC/IP and Sercos devices can operate over the same Ethernet cable. The high-efficiency Sercos telegrams use only a portion of the existing bandwidth, allowing non-Sercos telegrams to be transmitted via the UC channel.

A Sercos master and an EtherNet/IP scanner are required to implement a common network infrastructure. They can be combined into a dual-stack master.

Where redundancy is not necessary, the devices are connected in a line topology, where the last Sercos device in the line transmits and receives non-Sercos telegrams via its free port. A free port is not available when the network is configured in a ring topology for redundant data communication. In such a configuration, an IP switch is required to allow non-Sercos packets into the ring.

=== Functional safety support ===
"Functional safety" is a general term referring to the design of a system that reduces the risk that a hazardous event harmful to humans can occur with a system. The main definition is contained in the international standard IEC 61508. Most industrial networks contain some type of features to conform to functional safety requirements. Rather than define a unique specification for this functional safety, Sercos III Safety is based upon the CIP Safety protocol developed by the Open DeviceNet Vendors Association (ODVA). This provides interoperability at the safety level with all networks based upon the Common Industry Protocol (CIP), including DeviceNet and EtherNet/IP.

CIP Safety on Sercos provides for safe data transmission over Sercos III up to SIL 3 (Safety Integrity Level). No additional safety bus is required, as the safety information is sent in addition to the standard data on the Sercos network.

With CIP Safety on Sercos, data is sent on the same medium using the same connections as standard communication. The function of the cross-media CIP Safety protocol is performed by the end units, making it possible to simultaneously operate standard and safety devices in the same network. Reliable communication can take place between all network levels, including peer-to-peer communication and cross-network communication. The master does not necessarily have to be a safety controller. It can also route data without being able to interpret it. This makes it possible to configure the safety network architecture for the implementation of safety programmable controllers or peer-to-peer communication between sensors and actuators.

=== Sercos I/O Profile ===
The Sercos I/O profile is a device profile for decentralized I/O modules, which can be used for block and modular I/Os. It also supports hybrid devices that combine several functionalities in one single device, e.g., a two-axis controller with I/O and master functionality.

An XML-based device and profile description language is specified for I/O device configuration. SDDML (Sercos Device Description Markup Language) describes which profiles are supported by a certain device. SPDML (Sercos Profile Description Markup Language) is used to specify the different profiles based on the Sercos parameter model. Existing standard parameters can be used and manufacturer-specific parameters can also be defined.

=== Sercos Energy Profile ===
Sercos Energy is an application layer profile that defines parameters and commands for the reduction of energy consumption in a uniform vendor-independent manner.

Sercos Energy reduces energy consumption in three areas:

1. The permanent load at motor/machine standstill is reduced;
2. The energy consumption depending on the process is dynamically adjusted considering the target completion times/dates to achieve more efficient partial loading; and
3. Energy is saved during processing by switching off components that are not required at a particular time or point in the process (partial machine operation).

In operation, the control reads out the parameters of each Sercos Energy component via the Sercos III network, receiving status information and detailed consumption values. Depending on the situation (e.g., scheduled or unscheduled breaks, machine components not needed in the current production process) standardized commands can be issued by the control to switch connected components (drives, I/O, sensors) into energy-saving conditions, up to complete shut-down, reducing their energy consumption.

The profile considers energy-saving conditions for predictable breaks such as lunch periods and plant holidays. At pre-defined times, Sercos Energy components are brought into a standstill condition to save energy. Shortly before the end of the interruption, Sercos Energy provides for the re-initialization of components in stand-by condition, to make them available again.

Sercos Energy provides mechanisms for unintended breaks caused by machine errors and missing parts. In these situations, target components can be carefully brought into energy-saving modes while errors are being fixed or during a wait for new parts.

By using intelligent controls, axes, and components that are unneeded in ongoing production processes can be switched off, and/or target completion times can be adjusted, while still achieving full productivity.

=== Sercos Encoder Profile ===
The function-specific Encoder Profile ensures that encoders from different manufacturers can be utilized in Sercos applications without compatibility problems. Supported encoder functions are defined, and their use with other devices, e.g., controls, is specified. Both stand-alone encoders and hybrid devices with encoders are supported.

=== Sercos and OPC UA ===
The OPC Foundation and Sercos International developed an OPC UA companion specification which describes the mapping of Sercos to OPC UA. This makes the functions and parameters of Sercos III devices available to OPC UA, independent of any vendor. This simplifies communication between machine automation devices and higher-level supervisory systems.

The multi-protocol capabilities of Sercos III allow various implementation options. The OPC UA server functionality can be implemented into machine control or directly into a Sercos field device, such as a drive, sensor, or I/O module. An OPC client can also be integrated into a Sercos controller.

An OPC client and OPC UA server can communicate with each other even when Sercos real-time communication is not active, because the Sercos transmission process does not require tunneling.

=== Sercos and IO-Link ===
I/O Link is a digital interface for the connection of sensors and actuators to higher-level automation busses, such as Sercos III. An IO-Link master can be either a stand-alone slave or part of a modular slave device. An IO-Link-to-Sercos mapping guide is available to assist manufacturers in integrating IO-Link into a Sercos III network. An IO-Link development board with an IO-Link master and a Sercos III slave interface is available.

=== Sercos support for AS-i ===
AS-i (Actuator Sensor Interface) is a networking interface for the connection of simple field devices such as actuators and sensors to higher-level busses, such as Sercos III. Several AS-i/Sercos gateways are available for connection of AS-i devices to a Sercos III network.

=== TSN (Time Sensitive Networking) ===
Standard Ethernet is not deterministic and, therefore not suitable for hard real-time communications. To address that problem, the Time-Sensitive Networking task group of the IEEE 802.1 working group is developing a set of standards that define mechanisms for hard real-time data transmission over Ethernet networks.

A Sercos working group has determined that Sercos is compatible with TSN. A Sercos TSN demonstrator was developed to illustrate the real-time multi-protocol capable Sercos network based on TSN.

== Support ==
=== Driver software ===
Driver software is used to connect a controller to the device logic. Several basic Sercos drivers are available as open-source software from sourceforge.net. These include a common Sercos Master API library, Sercos Internet Protocol Services software and a Sercos UCC Ethernet network driver.

An open-source Sercos SoftMaster is also available from sourceforge.net. It emulates the Sercos functions so that a standard Ethernet controller can be used instead of FPGA or ASIC hardware.

A pre-certified CIP Safety on Sercos protocol software is available to equip Sercos and EtherNet/IP devices with the appropriate safe logic up to SIL3.

=== Certification ===
Conformance testing verifies that both controls and peripheral devices comply with Sercos standards and can operate interoperably in networks with products from multiple vendors. A testing tool, The Sercos Conformizer, can be used to subject a device to a pre-test before the formal conformance procedure.

=== Sercos User Groups ===
Sercos International e.V., a Sercos user's group headquartered in Germany, developed and supports Sercos as an open IEC standard, independent of any individual company. Any company can develop and use Sercos. Sercos also has user groups in North America and Asia.

Membership in a Sercos user's group is voluntary. Experts from both member and non-member companies actively contribute to the further development and support of Sercos via engineering working groups, considering market trends plus input from Sercos vendors regarding practical field applications.

Sercos International is a recognized partner of the Industrial Electrotechnical Commission (IEC) and actively contributes to the IEC standards for machine automation.
