= KMC Controls =

KMC Controls, Inc.
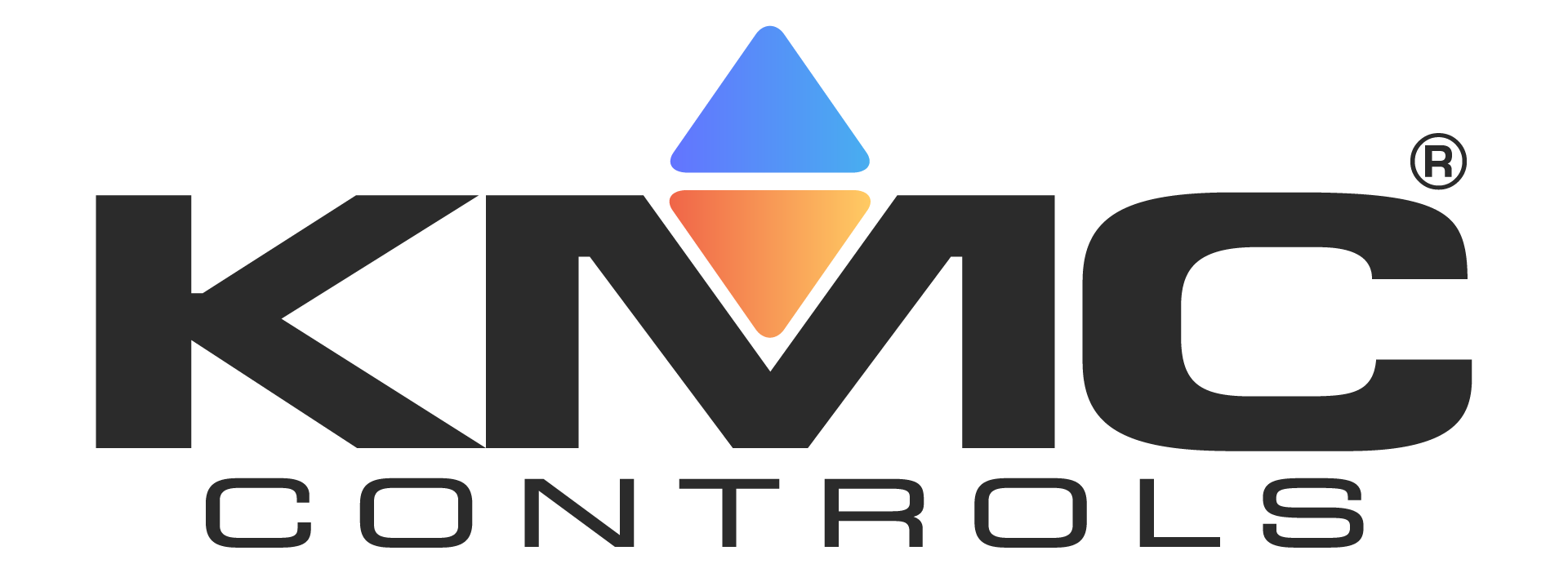
- Type: Privately held company
- Industry: Building automation, HVAC
- Founded: 1969
- Headquarters: New Paris, Indiana, USA
- Products: HVAC control system, Thermostats, Sensors, Actuators, Valves
- Website: www.kmccontrols.com

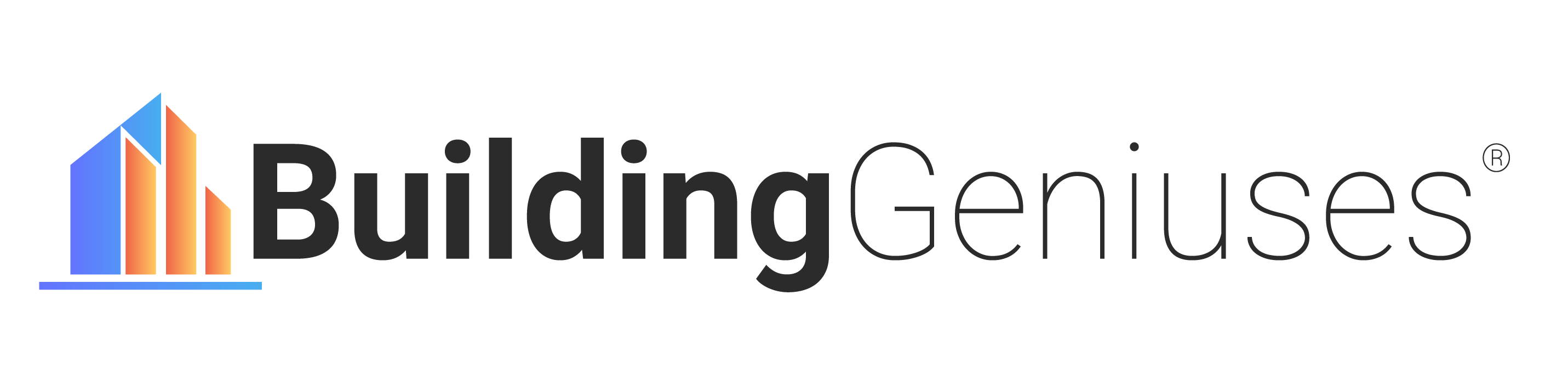
Trademarked identity for KMC Controls Inc.

KMC Controls (formerly Kreuter Manufacturing Company) has designed and manufactured HVAC control system products and building automation systems since 1969. KMC was one of the early privately held controls manufacturer with a full line of digital, electronic, and pneumatic products in the United States. The latest products include BACnet digital controllers and thermostats.

KMC is a member of the United States Green Building Council. Building automation products, such as those manufactured by KMC controls, provide tools for achieving prerequisites and credits for LEED certification in the categories of Indoor Environmental Quality, Energy and Atmosphere, Sustainable Sites, and Water efficiency for green buildings.

The company's intellectual property includes patents for (pneumatic, electronic, and digital) controllers, thermostats, actuators, and valves.

KMC maintains regional sales offices throughout the U.S. and distributes its products through system integrators (or authorized installing contractors), system distributors, wholesalers, and OEMs throughout North America as well as authorized distributors worldwide.

== History ==
In 1969, Ken Kreuter established Kreuter Manufacturing Company to manufacture pneumatic HVAC controls. In 1970, the company moved to Winnipeg, Manitoba because of business incentives. In 1974, the company moved to Minnesota, and, in 1978, the company moved manufacturing operations to its present location in New Paris, Indiana. In 1989, the research and development side of the business (then known as Kreuter Engineering) made the transition from Minnesota to Indiana as well in order to consolidate all company operations. In 1995, Kreuter Manufacturing Company, Inc. began doing business as KMC Controls, Inc., a name change that better reflected its business. Over the decades, analog electronic and then DDC (Direct Digital Control) products were added to the original pneumatic line.

== Products ==
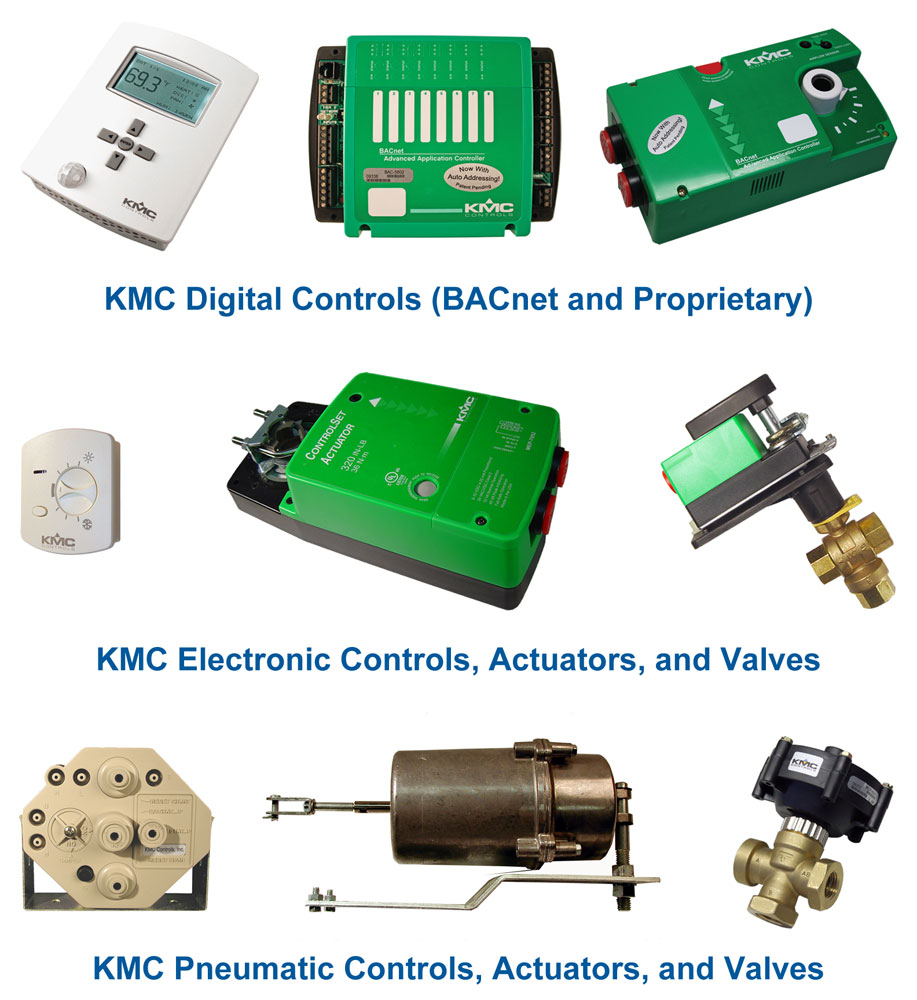
KMC Controls Product Family Samples

KMC Controls started with manufacturing pneumatic HVAC control products, including controllers, actuators, valves, and other related devices. A pneumatic HVAC control circuit operates on air pressure (typically between 3 and 13 psi) and uses mechanical means (actuators) to perform control functions. Pneumatic control systems are still used in many buildings, especially in metropolitan areas, because of their large base of installation throughout the 1960s and 1970s.

Throughout the 1980s, analog electronic control devices became increasingly popular. They provided faster response and higher precision than pneumatics. KMC manufactures electronic sensors, variable air volume controllers, thermostats, actuators, valves, and other devices that operate from low voltage DC analog signals.

In the 1990s, the standard became microprocessor-based direct digital controls that process a variety of analog and binary inputs and outputs. KMC Controls offers controllers and software in its KMDigital line using a proprietary protocol as well as a BACnet line with an open systems protocol. The BACnet communication protocol, developed by the American Society of Heating, Refrigerating and Air-Conditioning Engineers (ASHRAE), became an industry standard in the 2000s because of the desire for "open" communication systems.

The 2010s brought IoT (Internet of Things) and cloud-based services to the building automation industry and KMC products.

KMC Controls products and services have won a number of industry awards.
