= Ecobee =

Canadian home automation company

ecobee Inc.

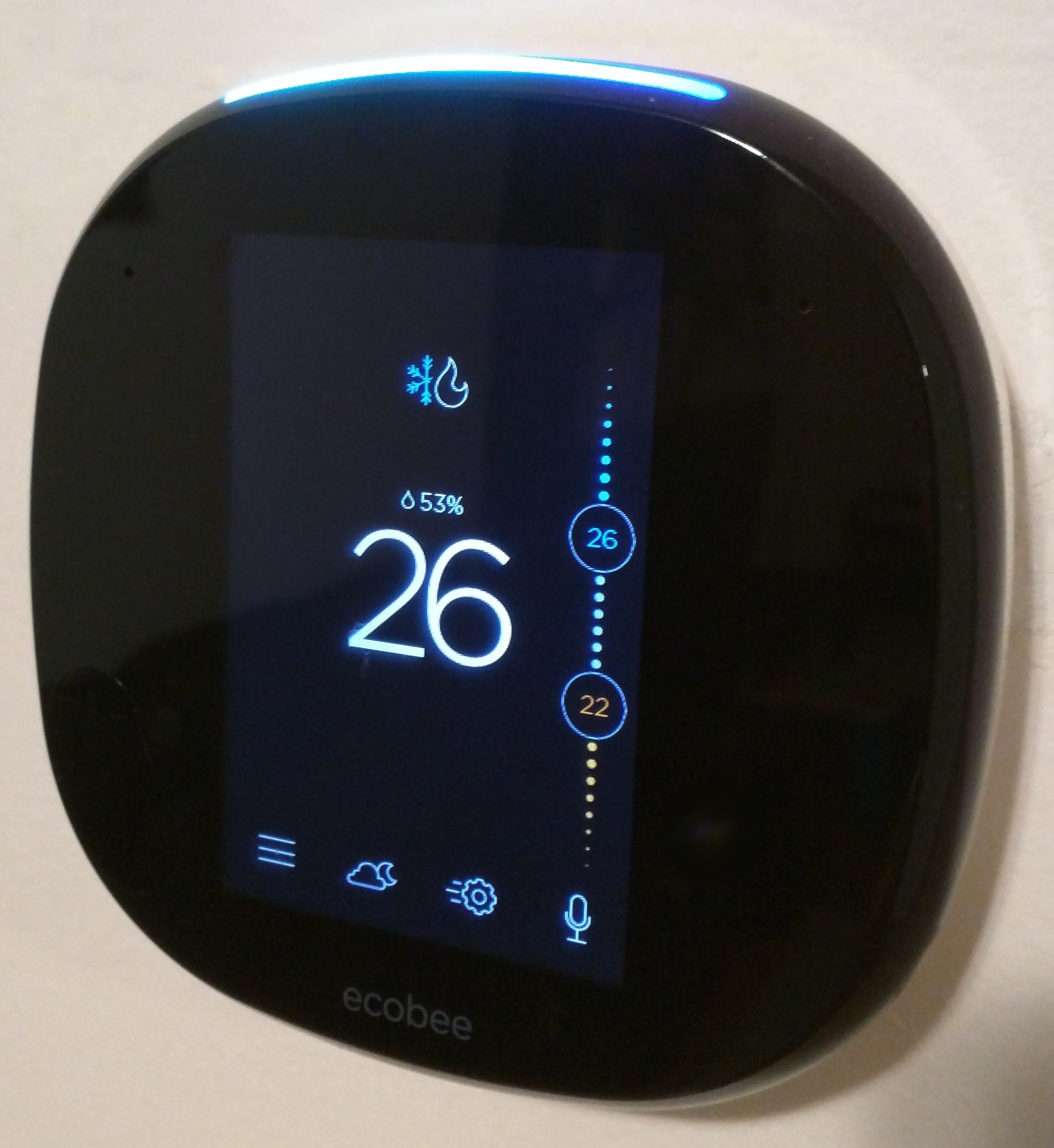
- ecobee4 smart thermostat
- Type: Subsidiary
- Industry: Home automation
- Founded: 2007; 19 years ago
- Founders: Stuart Lombard; Mark Malchiondo; John Metselaar
- Headquarters: Toronto, Ontario, Canada
- Area served: Canada; United States
- Key people: Stuart Lombard (President and CEO); Scott Cleaver (COO); David Brennan (CFO); John Metselaar ("Chief Hardware Architect")
- Products: Light switches; Smart thermostats
- Parent: Generac
- Website: ecobee.com

ecobee is an American home automation company based in Toronto that makes smart thermostats, temperature, and occupancy sensors, smart light switches, smart cameras, and contact sensors. They were acquired by the American company Generac Holdings in 2021.

The thermostats are controlled by using the built-in touchscreen, web portal, or app available for iOS, Android, and the Apple Watch. Other devices are controlled solely through the app or web portal.

The thermostat or camera acts as a smart home hub for their other devices. The light switches do not require a thermostat or camera but do not provide hub functionality. ecobee provides a set of subscription services.

== History ==
ecobee was founded by Stuart Lombard in 2007. The company's first smart thermostat was released in 2008. It has been recognized with a number of awards, including the Deloitte Technology Green 15 Award for Canadian green technology companies, and the 2011 AHR Expo Innovation Award in the category of building automation.

In March 2018, ecobee raised CA$80 million series C round of funding.

In November 2021, ecobee announced that it would be acquired by Generac Holdings for $770 million. The sale closed the following month.

== Products ==
=== Smart thermostats ===
ecobee created its smart thermostat, the ecobee Smart, in 2008.

Model	Launch price	Room sensors
Smart	$385 (USD)	Wired (requires remote sensor module added to equipment interface module)"Does ecobee3 support wired remote sensors? | Smart WiFi Thermostats by ecobee". www.ecobee.com. Archived from the original on 2015-04-13.
Smart Si	$179 (USD)	Wired (requires remote sensor module added to equipment interface module)"Does ecobee3 support wired remote sensors? | Smart WiFi Thermostats by ecobee". www.ecobee.com. Archived from the original on 2015-04-13.
ecobee3 (1st generation)	$249 (USD)	Room Sensors 915 MHz; Smart Sensors 915 MHz
ecobee3 (2nd generation)	$249 (USD)	Room Sensors 915 MHz; Smart Sensors 915 MHz
ecobee3 lite	$169 (USD)	Room Sensors 915 MHz; Smart Sensors 915 MHz
ecobee4	$249 (USD)	Room Sensors 915 MHz; Smart Sensors 915 MHz
ecobee Smart Thermostat with VoiceControl	$249 (USD)	Room Sensors 915 MHz; Smart Sensors 915 MHz
ecobee Smart Thermostat Enhanced	$189 (USD)	Room Sensors 915 MHz; Smart Sensors 915 MHz
ecobee Smart Thermostat Premium	$249 (USD)	Room Sensors 915 MHz; Smart Sensors 915 MHz
ecobee Smart Thermostat Essential	$139 (USD)	Room Sensors 915 MHz; Smart Sensors 915 MHz

=== eco+ ===
ecobee began rolling out eco+ in 2019 to personalize individual thermostats to the home's environment.

=== Smart light switch ===
The ecobee Switch+ is a smart light switch released on March 26, 2018. The Switch+ has a microphone with built-in Amazon Alexa, along with occupancy and daylight sensors.

=== SmartCamera ===
The ecobee SmartCamera released on April 15, 2020. It features 1080p video, a 180 degree field of view, auto pan-tilt, Amazon Alexa support, two-way talk, and night-vision.

=== Contact sensor ===
The ecobee SmartSensor contact sensors were released on April 15, 2020, alongside the SmartCamera.

=== Smart doorbell ===
The ecobee Smart Doorbell camera was released in October 2023. Users with an Ecobee thermostat can view the live feed from their doorbell camera on their thermostat.

The Smart Thermostat Essential was unveiled in January 2025.

=== Smart Security ===
ecobee Smart Security is a subscription-based self-monitoring home monitoring system which integrates the sensors in all of its products into a home security system.

=== Air Filters ===
ecobee Air Filters automatically sends the user furnace filters when their current filter must be replaced.
