= HVAC control system =

Control system for heating, ventilation, and air conditioning equipment

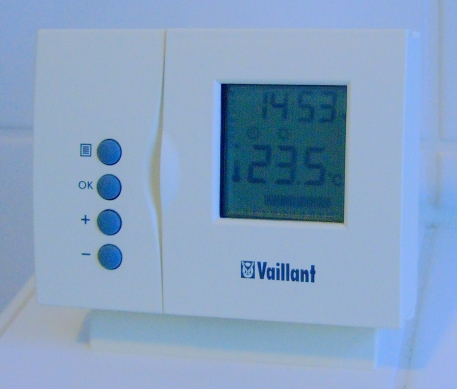
Smart Heating Technologies

HVAC (Heating, Ventilation and Air Conditioning) equipment needs a control system to regulate the operation of a heating and/or air conditioning system. Usually a sensing device is used to compare the actual state (e.g. temperature) with a target state. Then the control system determines what action has to be taken (e.g. start the blower).

== History ==
The first HVAC controllers utilized pneumatic controls since engineers understood fluid control. Thus, the properties of steam and air were used to control the flow of heated or cooled air via mechanically controlled logic.

After the control of air flow and temperature was standardized, the use of electromechanical relays in ladder logic to switch dampers became standardized. Eventually, the relays became electronic switches, as transistors eventually could handle greater current loads. By 1985, pneumatic controls could no longer compete with this new technology although pneumatic control systems (sometimes decades old) are still common in many older buildings.

By the year 2000, computerized controllers were common. Today, some of these controllers can even be accessed by web browsers, which need no longer be in the same building as the HVAC equipment. This allows some economies of scale, as a single operations center can easily monitor multiple buildings.

== Direct digital control ==
Prior to about the late 1960s, HVAC systems were controlled by pneumatics (using air pressure and tubes to move valves and dampers). Then, digital computerization began to replace those systems. Central controllers and most terminal unit controllers are programmable, meaning the direct digital control (DDC) program code may be customized for the intended use. The program features include time schedules, set points, controllers, logic, timers, trend logs, and alarms. The unit controllers typically have analog and digital inputs that allow measurement of the variable (temperature, humidity, or pressure) and analog and digital outputs for control of the transport medium (hot/cold water and/or steam). Digital inputs are typically (dry) contacts from a control device, and analog inputs are typically a voltage or current measurement from a variable (temperature, humidity, velocity, or pressure) sensing device. Digital outputs are typically relay contacts used to start and stop equipment, and analog outputs are typically voltage or current signals to control the movement of the medium (air/water/steam) control devices such as valves, dampers, and motors.

Groups of DDC controllers, networked or not, form a layer of systems themselves. This "subsystem" is vital to the performance and basic operation of the overall HVAC system. The DDC system is the "brain" of the HVAC system. It dictates the position of every damper and valve in a system. It determines which fans, pumps, and chiller run and at what speed or capacity. With this configurable intelligence in this "brain", we are moving to the concept of building automation.

== Building automation system ==
More complex HVAC systems can interface with a Building Automation System (BAS) to allow the building owners to have more control over the heating or cooling units. The building owner can monitor the system and respond to alarms generated by the system from local or remote locations. The system can be scheduled for occupancy or the configuration can be changed from the BAS. Sometimes the BAS is directly controlling the HVAC components. Depending on the BAS different interfaces can be used.

Today, there are also dedicated gateways that connect advanced VRV / VRF and Split HVAC Systems with Home Automation and BMS (Building Management Systems) controllers for centralized control and monitoring, obviating the need to purchase more complex and expensive HVAC systems. In addition, such gateway solutions are capable of providing remote control operation of all HVAC indoor units over the internet.

== See also ==
- American Society of Heating, Refrigerating and Air-Conditioning Engineers
- BACnet
- Building Automation
- OpenTherm
