= Lux Products =

- Products: Thermostats, Timers, Range Parts

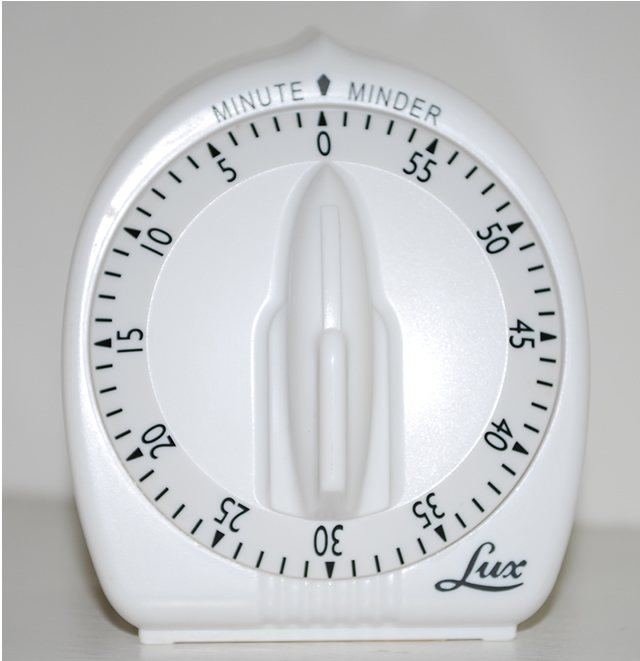
Lux Products' Minute Minder timer.

== History ==
The company had its origins in the Lux Clock Manufacturing Company, founded in 1914 by Paul Lux. After being employed by the Waterbury Clock Company of Connecticut, Mr. Lux, along with his German-born wife Caroline, and sons Fred and Herman, decided to start their own clock business. The Lux Clock Manufacturing Company was based in Waterbury, Connecticut and produced only clock movements at that time. In the years that followed, the company grew and began making the entire clock unit. Lux Clock produced clocks until 1941, at which time they made war related products.

Clock production resumed after the war, and in 1954 a plant was established in Lebanon, Tennessee. By 1959 a Lux Time Ltd. facility was built in Ontario, Canada. In June 1961, the Robertshaw-Fulton Controls Company, a leading manufacturer of thermostats and controls, bought out the Lux Clock Manufacturing Company.

Robertshaw also produced clocks and timers under the Robertshaw Controls Company, Lux Time Division name. Robertshaw sold its consumer division of the company in 1991 to Michael DeLuca and it was run by Paul Balon, CEO. The new company, Lux Products Corporation retained the original Lux name and continued to produce thermostats, timers, and additional household items. Lux Products was headquartered in Philadelphia, Pennsylvania, with its U.S. plant based in Laredo, Texas.

Johnson Controls Inc acquired the assets of Lux Products Corporation in October 2018. and divested it in September 2023

== Products ==
=== Thermostats ===
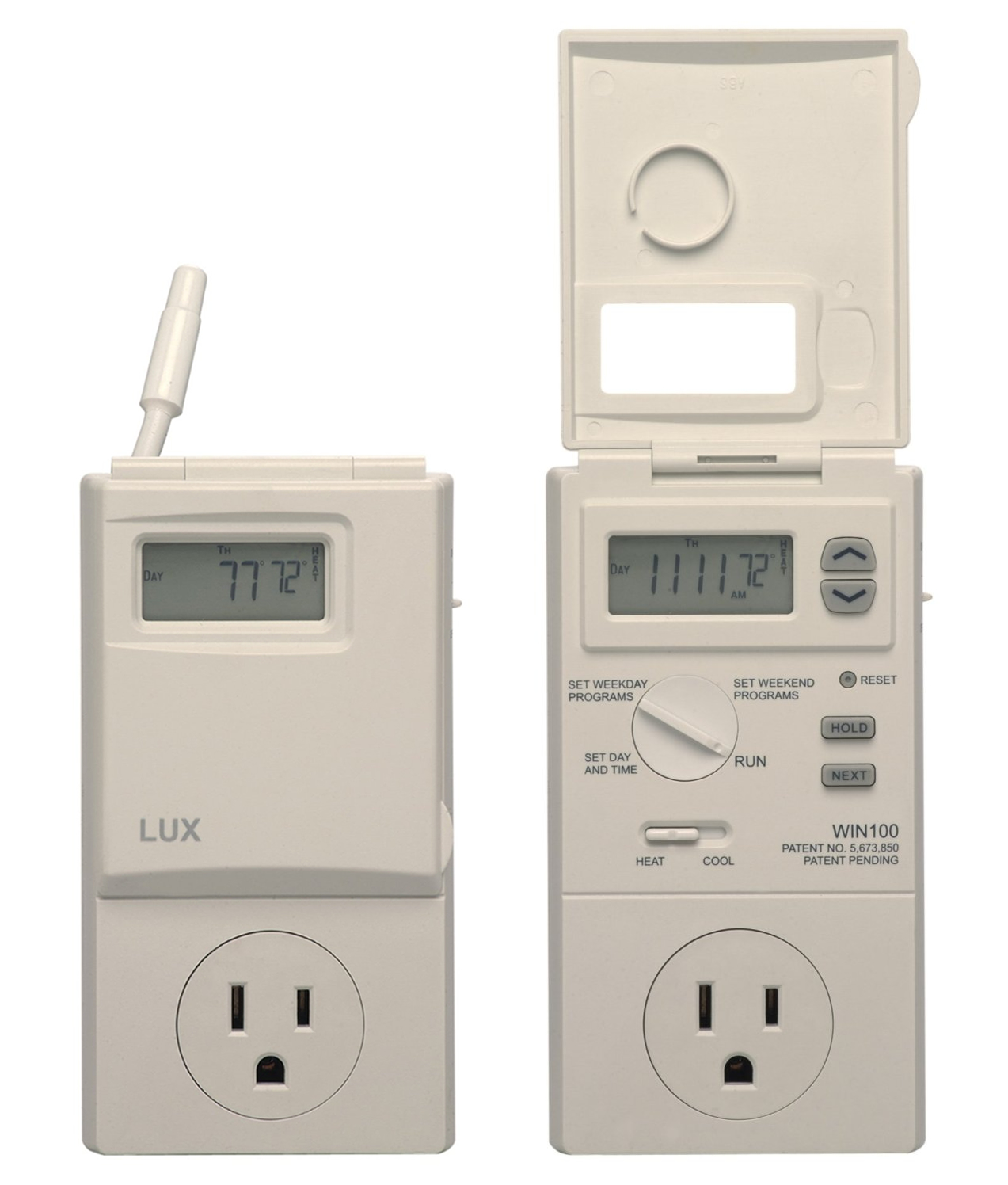
Lux Products WIN100 Heating & Cooling Programmable Outlet Thermostat shown with control door closed and open.

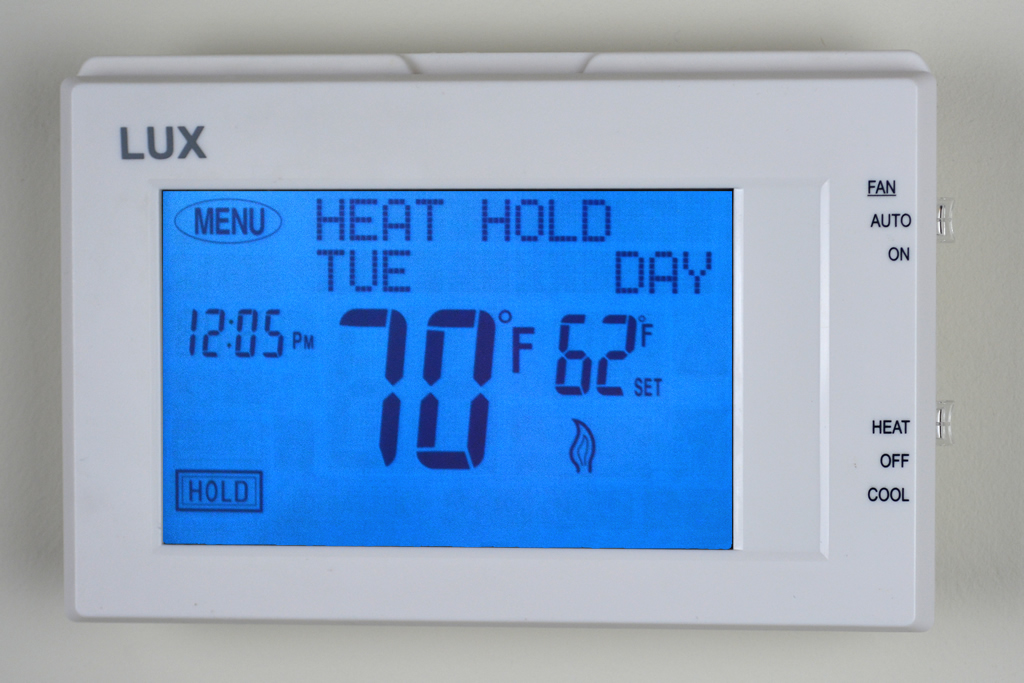
Next Generation Lux Products TX9600TS Universal 7-Day Programmable Touch Screen Thermostat.

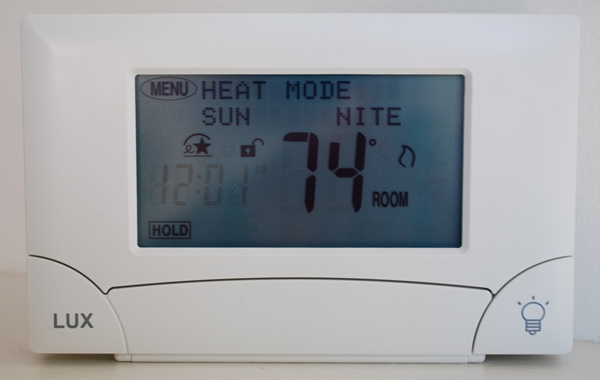
Lux Products' Model TX9000TS touch-screen thermostat

Lux Products Corporation produces electronic (programmable and digital) and mechanical thermostats for nearly every heating and cooling application. Lux thermostats have been mentioned by energy bloggers for their energy efficient and mercury-free thermostats. A programmable thermostat can save energy by adjusting heating or cooling for the periods when the building is in use. Such products may meet the Energy Star ratings under the program started by the EPA.

=== Timers ===
The company's timer line includes the Minute Minder timers, the modern versions thereof introduced by the Lux Clock Manufacturing Company around 1950. The original timers were offered in white with red numerals, but different colors were later added to the line. The timer line also includes digital timers and kitchen timers made of anti-microbial materials.

=== Range replacement parts ===
Lux Products Corporation produces gas and electric range parts.
