= Smart thermostat =

Temperature maintenance device connected to Wi-Fi

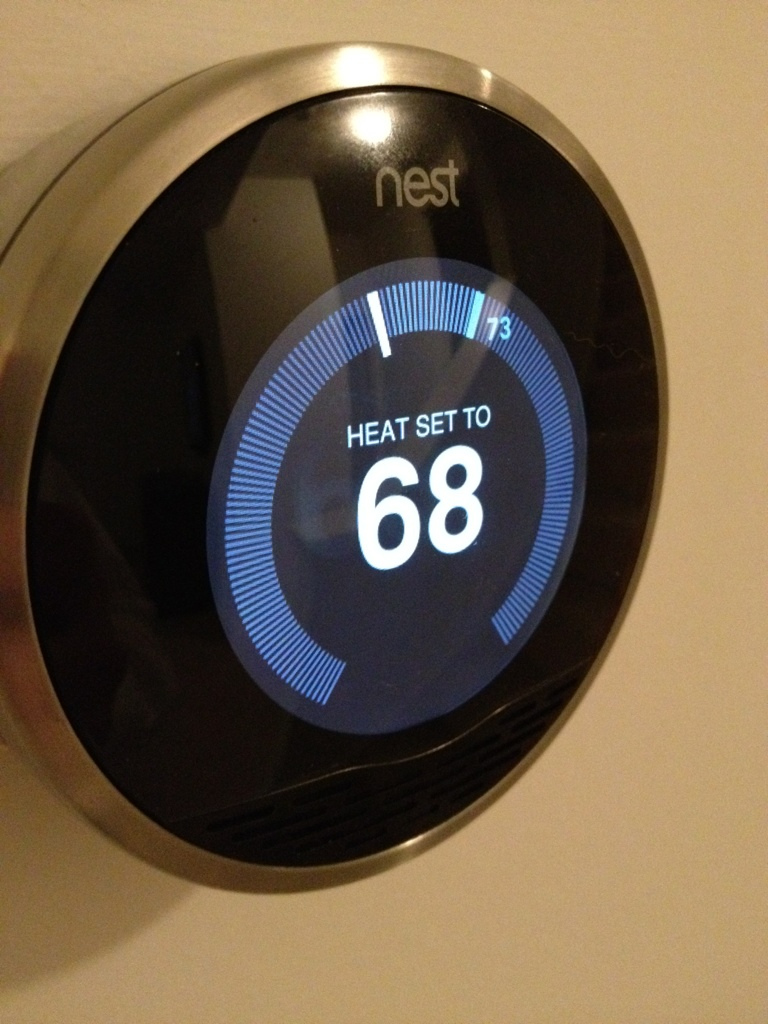
A Nest Labs thermostat

Smart thermostats are Wi-Fi thermostats that can be used with home automation and are responsible for controlling a home's heating, ventilation, and air conditioning. They perform similar functions as a programmable thermostat as they allow the user to control the temperature of their home throughout the day using a schedule, but also contain additional features, such as Wi-Fi connectivity, that improve upon the issues with programming.

Like other Wi-Fi thermostats, they are connected to the Internet via a Wi-Fi network. They allow users to adjust heating settings from other internet-connected devices, such as a laptop or smartphones. This allows users to control the thermostat remotely. This ease of use is essential for ensuring energy savings: studies have shown that households with programmable thermostats actually have higher energy consumption than those with simple thermostats because residents program them incorrectly or disable them completely.

Smart thermostats also record internal/external temperatures, the time the HVAC system has been running and can notify the user if the system's air filter needs to be replaced. This information is typically displayed later on an internet-connected device such as a smartphone.

== Manual programmable vis-à-vis smart thermostats ==
=== Manual thermostats ===
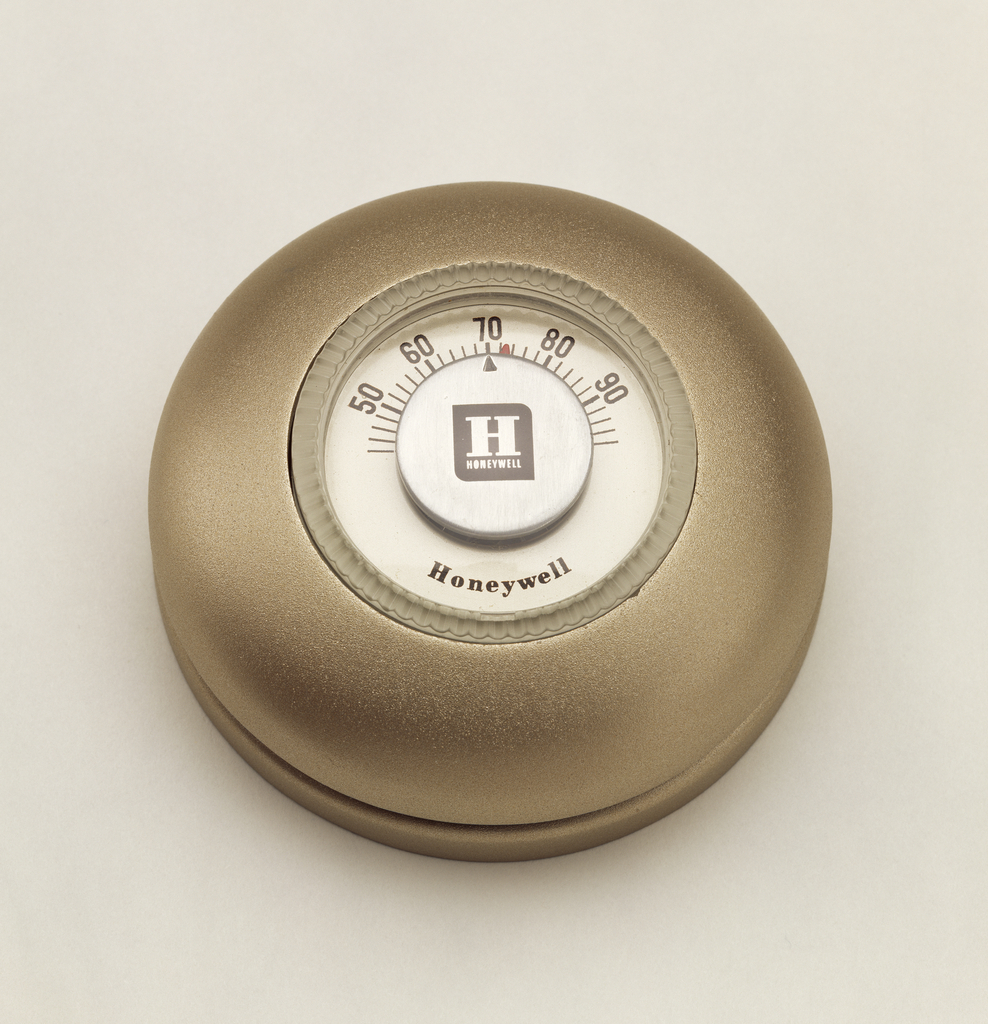
Honeywell Manual Thermostat

Manual thermostats (also known as analog thermostats) are the oldest and simplest type of thermostats. These thermostats are set to one temperature and do not change until the user manually adjusts the temperature.

=== Programmable thermostats ===
Programmable thermostats, first introduced over 100 years ago, are a type of thermostat that allows the user to set a schedule for different temperatures at different times. Most programmable thermostats also have a hold feature which suspends the schedule and effectively turns the thermostat into a manual thermostat. The idea of the scheduling feature is that users will set a warmer or cooler temperature when the home is unoccupied to save energy and money. Due to this assumed energy savings, some building codes and government programs began requiring the use of programmable thermostats. Due to the way people use these devices, most programmable thermostats result in more energy use than the basic manual thermostat.

==== Issues with programmable thermostats ====
One of the main objectives of smart thermostats is to reduce the issues involved with using traditional programmable thermostats. In order to understand how smart thermostats take on this task, it is important to understand the issues regarding programmable thermostats and how they affect energy consumption. Between 2008-2009, Florida Power & Light (FPL) provided 400 homeowners with programmable thermostats and monitored their heating and cooling patterns. Out of the 400 participants, 56% of users used the programming feature while the remaining participants did not program the thermostat and left it on "hold". It was determined that the users who used the programming feature actually consumed 12% more energy than the non-programmers. This consumption increase resulted from higher overnight duty cycles associated with lower thermostat setpoints (i.e. lower temperature setting), due to confusion with setting the schedule. This study reveals that programmable thermostats will not necessarily save energy. The smart thermostat attempts to combat this issue by taking the user out of the picture and relying on sensors and computers to save energy.

Another study conducted on the issue determined that the biggest problem for programmable thermostats was the human using it. The technology inside a programmable thermostat is no doubt one of the most important factors in determining whether or not the thermostat will be successful in saving energy. But an equally important factor is the human who is using the thermostat. Unfortunately, many people who own programmable thermostats do not know how to use the thermostat or are not using all of the features that are offered. One study conducted a number of interviews, surveys, and observations to determine that the vast majority of programmable thermostat owners are not using the thermostats for their intended purpose. An online survey showed that 89% of respondents do not use the schedule feature on their programmable thermostat. Other results from the interviews and surveys show that a large number of people have misconceptions about heating/cooling and the use of programmable thermostats. One misconception is people believing that heating all of the time is more efficient than scheduling the heat to turn off. Another misconception noted in the study is that turning down the thermostat does not substantially reduce energy consumption. These misconceptions reaffirm the idea that the programmable thermostat itself could have all of the necessary tools, but if the user does not use them or uses them incorrectly, then these thermostats will fail at saving energy.

As a result of these studies and others like them, energy star suspended its labelling of programmable thermostats in December 2009. It became the goal of smart thermostats to address these issues by taking the human out of the picture and creating a thermostat that uses smart computing to truly reduce energy usage and cost.

=== Smart thermostats ===
Smart thermostats are similar to programmable thermostats in the sense that they have a scheduling feature that allows users to set different temperatures for different times of the day. In addition to this feature, smart thermostats implement other technologies to reduce the amount of human error involved with using programmable thermostats. Smart thermostats incorporate the use of sensors that determine whether or not the home is occupied and can suspend heating or cooling until the occupant returns. Additionally, smart thermostats utilize Wi-Fi connectivity to give the user access to the thermostat at all times. These additional technologies have proven to make smart thermostats successful in saving users energy and money.

== History ==
Development of the smart thermostat began in 2007 with the creation of the ecobee thermostat. The founder of ecobee, Stuart Lombard, wanted to save energy and reduce his family's carbon footprint. After realizing that heating and cooling made up most of his home's energy usage, Lombard purchased a programmable thermostat in an attempt to reduce total energy usage. Lombard quickly discovered that the programmable thermostat was difficult to use and unreliable. Following difficulties with the programmable thermostat, he set out to create a smart thermostat that saved energy and was easy to use. With that goal, the ecobee company was created in attempt to offer users a thermostat that could truly save energy by fixing the issues with programmable thermostats.

Following the ecobee, EnergyHub released its version of a smart thermostat in 2009 with the creation of the EnergyHub Dashboard. The co-founder of EnergyHub, Seth Frader-Thompson, got the idea for the Dashboard from his Prius. The Prius had screens on the dashboard that displayed the car's gas mileage in real time. Thompson felt that a house should have something that does the same. With that goal in mind, Thompson created a thermostat that could communicate with a home's furnace and appliances to determine the energy usage and efficiency and how much it was costing. The thermostat also had the capability to turn off appliances or raise and lower the temperature to save energy and cost. Ultimately, the goal of this thermostat was to display energy usage to users and to save energy and money.

Nest Labs company logo. Creators of the Nest Learning Thermostat.

In 2011, Nest Labs developed the Nest Learning Thermostat. The Nest Thermostat attempted to reduce home energy consumption by addressing the problems with programmable thermostats through the use of better technology. This new technology included the implementation of sensors, algorithms, machine learning, and cloud computing. These technologies learn the behaviors and preferences of the occupants, and adjust the temperature up or down to make the occupant comfortable when they are home and to save energy when they are away. Additionally, the Nest Thermostat connects to the home Wi-Fi. This allows users to change the temperature, adjust the schedule, and check energy usage from a smartphone or laptop. All of these features were part of Nest's goal to create an easy-to-use thermostat that saves users energy and money.

== Technology ==
=== Programmable schedule and auto schedule ===
The programmable schedule feature on the smart thermostat is similar to that on standard programmable thermostats. Users are given the option to program a custom schedule to reduce energy usage when they are away from the home. Studies have shown, though, that manually creating a schedule may lead to more energy usage than just keeping the thermostat at a set temperature. To avoid this problem, smart thermostats also provide an auto schedule feature. This feature requires the use of algorithms and pattern recognition to create a schedule that results in occupant comfort and energy savings. Upon creating a schedule, the thermostat will continue monitoring occupant behavior to make changes to the auto schedule. By taking the human error out of the scheduling, smart thermostats can create smart schedules that actually save energy.

=== Sensor ===
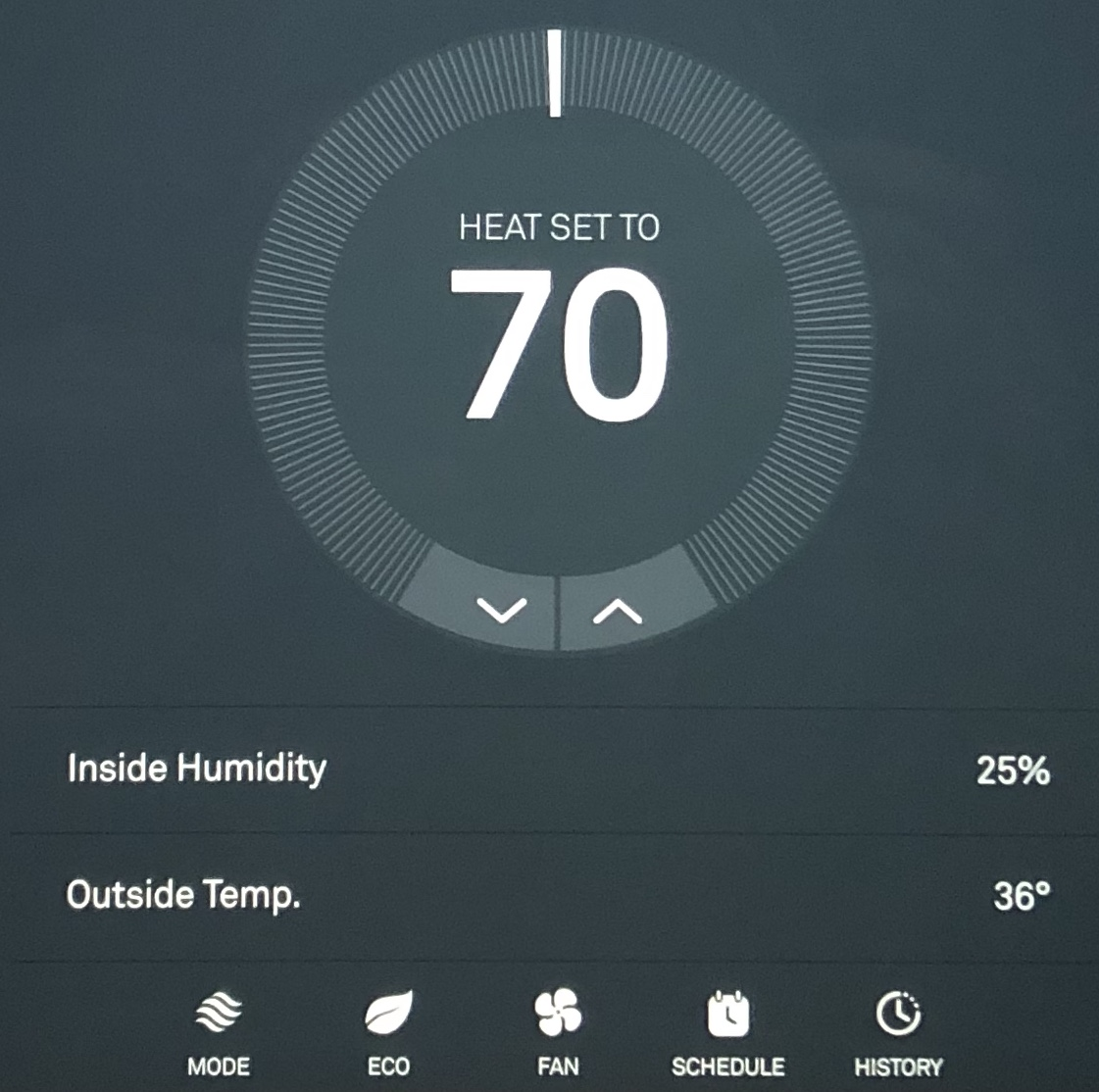
The Nest Web Portal allows users to remotely change the temperature, create a schedule, and view past energy usage.

In an attempt to mitigate the issues with human error involved with programmable thermostats, the smart thermostat utilizes a sensor that can determine occupancy patterns to automatically change the temperature based on occupant patterns and behaviors. The Nest Learning Thermostat in particular uses passive infrared (PIR) motion sensors inside the unit to sense occupancy in the vicinity of the thermostat. This sensor informs the thermostat whether or not the home is occupied. In the case that the home is not occupied, the thermostat can suspend heating/cooling until the sensor is reactivated by an occupant. This sensor is also used to determine the occupancy patterns to create the auto schedule. A grille member is placed in front of the sensor to visually conceal and protect the PIR motion sensor inside the thermostat. The grille also helps to make the thermostat visually pleasing. While this sensor technology is important for conserving energy, it is not without flaws. One of the major issues is that the sensor must be activated by someone walking in front of or near the thermostat. It is possible that an occupant could be at home and not pass in front of the sensor. In this case, the thermostat would shut off the heating/cooling and decrease human comfort.

=== Wi-Fi connection ===
A major feature of Wi-Fi thermostats (such as smart thermostats) is their ability to connect to the internet. These thermostats are designed with a Wi-Fi module that allows the thermostat to connect to the user's home or office network and interface with a web portal or smartphone application, allowing users to control the thermostat remotely. The Wi-Fi feature also has the ability to send reports on energy usage and HVAC system performance via the web portal, informing the user on their energy efficiency and how it compares to other smart thermostat users. It also may alert users when a problem arises with their HVAC system or when it is time for equipment maintenance. The thermostat also may use the Wi-Fi connection to display current weather conditions and the weather forecast.

Another feature offered by some smart thermostats through the internet connection is geofencing. A geofence is a perimeter boundary created around the location of a smartphone or other device, based on GPS signals. The benefit of having a smart thermostat with geofencing capabilities is that it uses a users smartphone location to determine whether the home is occupied. Instead of using a schedule or sensor to determine occupancy, the smart thermostat can rely on the location of the geofence to tell the HVAC system whether it needs to be on or off. Since most people carry their phones with them, geofencing can be an accurate way to determine occupancy patterns.

== Learning thermostats ==
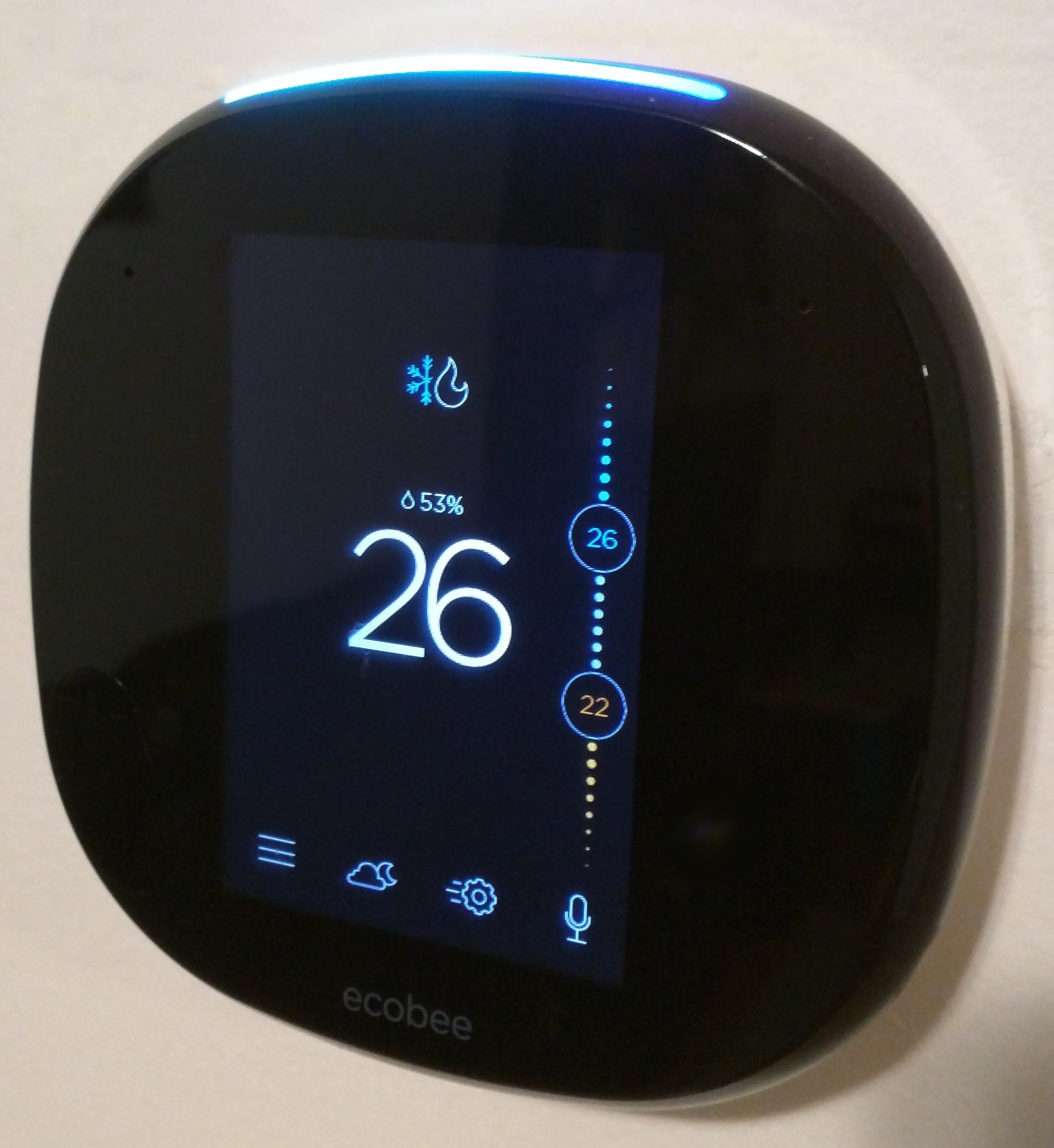
The Ecobee 4 thermostat

Some smart thermostats, such as the Nest thermostat, can learn when the house is likely to be occupied, and when it is likely to be empty. This allows automatic pre-heating or pre-cooling so the temperature is comfortable when a resident arrives. If the residents or lifestyles change, these smart thermostats will gradually adjust the schedule, maintaining energy savings and comfort.

Motion detectors can determine if someone is home. One smart thermostat that uses motion detectors is the Ecobee4.

A wireless network can be used to sense when someone is out of range, thus determining if they're in or nearby their home. This geofencing technique is used by the Honeywell T6 Smart Thermostat.

== Studies ==
=== Internal studies ===
To show that their thermostats save energy and money, numerous smart thermostat producers have conducted models and studies to confirm their savings claims. One popular way that smart thermostat producers calculate energy usage is through energy modeling. In these models, the smart thermostat is compared to a thermostat set at a constant temperature, and savings are calculated. Using this method, ecobee calculated energy savings by correlating how long heating and cooling equipment run to local weather conditions. Energy savings were calculated relative to a constant temperature of 22 °C (72 °F). Upon conducting this model, ecobee determined a 23% savings on heating and cooling costs for those who switch to their smart thermostat. Using a similar modeling method, Nest claimed a 20% energy savings for homeowners who install a Nest Learning Thermostat.

To determine energy savings using actual data instead of energy models, in February 2015, Nest conducted a national study of Nest customers in 41 states who had enrolled in Nest's MyEnergy service. In May 2013, Nest acquired MyEnergy, a company that tracks and analyzes utility usage of people enrolled in the program. Upon acquiring MyEnergy, Nest was able to use the historical data to determine the energy savings of those who installed the Nest Learning Thermostat. This study looked at energy usage before and after the installation of a Nest Learning Thermostat and used a weather normalization procedure to prevent unusually cold or warm weather from skewing the data. The study had a sample size of 735 homes for gas usage analysis and 624 homes for electrical analysis. All of these homes were enrolled in the MyEnergy program and had sufficient energy data before and after the installation of a Nest Learning Thermostat. After observing the energy usage for one year, Nest determined that there was an average gas savings of 10% and a cooling savings of 17.5%. The savings varied from house to house depending on how occupants set their thermostat before the installation of a Nest thermostat, along with differences in occupancy patterns, house characteristics, and weather.

Gas and Electric Savings Results
Fuel	Sample Size	Pre-Nest Total Energy Use	Pre-Nest HVAC	Total Energy Savings	% of HVAC
Natural Gas (therms/yr)	735	774	584	56 ±12	9.6 ±2.1%
Electricity (kWh/yr)	624	12,355	3,351	585 ±97	17.5 ±2.9%

While the results from the MyEnergy study are significantly lower than those from energy modeling, both show a savings in energy usage by switching to a smart thermostat.

=== Third-party studies ===
Since the release of smart thermostats, a number of third party studies have been conducted to determine if smart thermostats actually save energy and how they compare to manual and programmable thermostats with regards to savings. One study conducted an experiment in which 300 standard programmable thermostats were placed in homes and 300 Nest smart thermostats were placed in other homes. The homeowners involved in this study received proper training on how to properly use all of the thermostat functions. This effectively eliminated the issues regarding human error with programmable thermostats. All homes were located within one region of Indiana and had previously undergone home energy assessment. After 1 year of observation, the study concluded that Nest users reduced their heating gas consumption by 12.5% while users of a standard programmable thermostat reduced consumption by 5%. Additionally, it was concluded that Nest and standard programmable thermostat users reduced their cooling electric consumption by 13.9% and 13.1%, respectively. The major factors that allowed Nest to reduce consumption more than other thermostats was its ability to further reduce human error and set more efficient temperatures. The Nest thermostat used sensors and Wi-Fi connectivity to adjust the temperature on its own and provide more savings. This study helps to suggest that smart thermostats are in fact successful in reducing energy consumption.

Gas Savings as a Percentage of Heating Gas Usage
Thermostat	Pre Heating Usage (Therms)	Savings (Therms)	Savings (%)	Range of Savings (Therms)	Range of Savings (%)
Nest	548	69	12.5%	60 to 77	11 to 14%
Programmable	602	30	5%	22 to 38	4 to 6%

Electric Savings as a Percentage of Cooling Electricity Usage
Thermostat	Pre Usage (kWh)	Savings (kWh)	Savings (%)	Range of Savings (kWh)	Range of Savings (%)
Nest	3,080	429	13.9%	270 to 589	9 to 19%
Programmable	2,537	332	13.1%	181 to 483	7 to 19%

A similar study conducted in 2012 with the ecobee thermostat also concluded that smart thermostats are capable of saving energy. The goal of this pilot program was to determine the gas and electric savings of smart thermostats. This study provided 86 households with 123 ecobee thermostats and monitored the homes for 12 months. The study included 69 houses from Massachusetts and 17 from Rhode Island. The participants either had manual or programmable thermostats before the study was conducted. Gas and electric billing data were provided for 12 months before the study was conducted to use as a baseline. After the 12 months of observation, the study concluded that ecobee thermostats led to an average electricity savings of 16% and an average gas savings of 10%. The gas savings for manual thermostat replacements (10% per thermostat) was found to be larger than for programmable thermostat replacements (8% per thermostat). The difference in electricity savings between homes whose prior equipment was a manual thermostat or programmable thermostat was found to be minimal.

Gas Billing Analysis Savings Summary
Previous Thermostat	Number of Participants	Pre Usage (Therms)	Savings (Therms)	Savings (%)	Range of Savings (Therms)	Range of Savings (%)
Manual Thermostat	23	890	87	10%	60 to 113	7 to 13%
Programmable Thermostat	44	842	66	8%	43 to 88	5 to 10%

Electric Savings Analysis Savings Summary
Previous Thermostat	Number of Participants	Pre Usage (kWh)	Savings (kWh)	Savings (%)
Manual and Programmable Thermostat	12	640	113	16%

Although these studies report differing amounts of savings compared to the internal studies conducted by Nest and ecobee, both of these studies show that smart thermostats have the potential to save energy. This suggests that the technologies added to fix the issues with programmable thermostats have been successful.

=== Study discrepancies ===
Although most studies show that smart thermostats show an energy savings, the amount of savings varies. A large discrepancy is seen between energy modeling savings and the savings found using actual data. The energy modeling compares the smart thermostat to a constant set point temperature of 72 °F, but an online survey conducted by Nest showed that most users have a set point temperature that is 10% more efficient. Therefore, the savings predicted by the energy modeling are going to be higher than real savings.

There are other factors that cause discrepancies even between studies that all look at actual data. Most studies compare total energy consumption of a house from year to year to determine energy savings, as opposed to looking at just the energy that is used for heating and cooling. Due to this, there could be other factors that change the energy consumption of a house, and it might be incorrect to state that the thermostat is responsible for all energy savings in a house. For example, it is possible that other new energy efficient practices/appliances are partially responsible for the savings in addition to the thermostat.

Another discrepancy to consider is the population of people involved in the study. Some studies, such as the MyEnergy study, involve people who signed up for an energy analysis program. These people are likely to be more energy conscious and efficient and have better heating and cooling practices. This greater interest in energy efficiency may lead to lower energy savings by switching to a smart thermostat. The most energy-conscious customers are the ones more likely to have had efficient thermostat settings, therefore, the savings that they receive from the smart thermostat may not be as great.

The weather will also have an impact on the results of a study. Having very high temperatures in the summer and very cold temperatures in the winter will lead to more cooling and heating in those months, requiring more energy. When comparing year to year data, if one year had extreme temperatures, while the following year had moderate temperatures, the savings may look drastic. In reality though, the savings are not from the thermostat, but rather from the change in weather. Studies will try to mitigate this problem through weather normalization procedures.

=== Broader Impact ===
While smart thermostats have the potential to save energy consumption, they can create unintended consequences on the broader electrical grid. Smart thermostats tend to operate similarly across a population and can create load synchronization. This load synchronization can create much higher peaks and more rapid changes in heating demand. Particularly in the winter, this heating demand is shifted earlier in the morning, when solar electricity is unavailable, making it more difficult to supply electric heating sources like heat pumps with renewable energy.

== Improvements ==
=== Motion sensors ===
One issue with using a smart thermostat is the unreliability of the motion sensor. One of the main features of the smart thermostat is the ability to change the temperature when the sensor in the thermostat does not sense an occupant. The only sensor that is used though is the sensor in the thermostat. This means that if the home is occupied but no one walks passed the thermostat, the thermostat will think that the home is unoccupied and will change the temperature, potentially leading to occupant discomfort.

One study attempted to address this issue by adding more sensors throughout the house. Instead of using just one sensor in the thermostat, this team experimented with placing motion sensors and door sensors throughout the house to gain better understanding of the occupant's sleeping and occupancy patterns. These sensors communicated with each other and used an algorithm to quickly determine whether the occupants were active, sleeping, or away. The system used historical data to estimate when occupants would be returning and would begin "preheating" the home before they arrived. Additionally, the system would drift further from the set point when it was certain that no one was home. The study compared a standard ("reactive") smart thermostat and the multiple sensor system to a manual thermostat. The study concluded that a reactive smart thermostat with just on sensor saves, on average, 6.8% of energy consumption, while the multiple sensor system saved an average of 28% of energy consumption. This study again shows that, on average, smart thermostats achieve their goal of saving energy. It also shows that smart thermostats are not as well developed as they could be, and the addition of more sensors could result in better performance and energy savings.

=== User interface ===
One of the issues with programmable thermostats that smart thermostats try to fix is the confusing user interface. Many owners of programmable thermostats found the controls and directions to be too confusing and opted out of using the scheduling feature completely. Others who used the feature used it incorrectly, due to the confusing directions, and saw an increase in energy usage. Developers of smart thermostats have attempted to fix this issue by creating simple to use thermostats and providing proper direction. While this is an improvement on programmable thermostats, studies have shown that users desire more intense training from the installer of the thermostat on how to use the technical features. Additionally, many smart thermostats use a web portal where users can adjust the thermostat settings and look at their energy usage history. Again, studies have shown that users want this feature to be improved. Some complain that the web portal is not user friendly and they desire more training on how to use the web features during installation.

=== Internet security ===
Researchers from the University of Central Florida conducted an experiment to show that hackers could use the Nest thermostat as an entry point into one's home. Upon being connected to the internet, the hackers could use the thermostat to control local network traffic from a remote location. The hacker could also use the thermostat to act as a spy and would know whether or not the home is occupied. The research showed that in order for a hacker to gain access to the thermostat, they would have to gain physical access to the device and upload the malicious firmware via a USB port. This drastically decreases the chances that this type of attack will occur, but it is still possible if a used thermostat is purchased with the firmware already uploaded. The problem that allows this type of attack is with the hardware in the thermostat. Therefore, Nest cannot repair this issue with a simple software update, but rather it would need to build a new thermostat that can prevent this type of attack.

== Sustainability ==
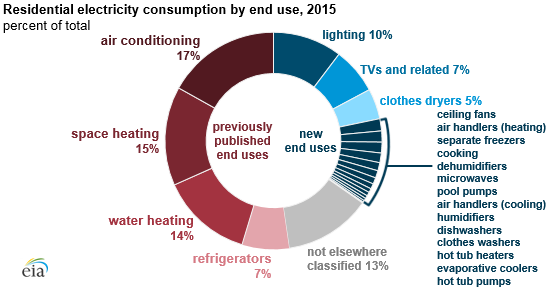
Residential Energy Consumption Survey conducted by the U.S. Energy Information Administration shows residential electricity consumption by category.

=== Climate change ===
According to the 2015 Residential Energy Consumption Survey conducted by the U.S. Energy Information Administration, home heating and cooling account for the highest percentage of residential electrical energy consumption. Air conditioning accounts for 17% of electrical usage while space heating accounts for 15%. The Residential Energy Consumption Survey from 2009 looked at energy consumption from all energy types (natural gas and electricity). This survey determined that space heating accounted for 42% of all residential energy consumption, while air conditioning accounted for 6%. This energy usage needed to heat and cool homes is directly linked to climate change, as the energy provided for heating and cooling often comes from the burning of fossil fuels, leading to the release of greenhouse gas emissions. With an added focus on combating climate change and global warming, nations from around the world have begun to take on this issue by limiting greenhouse gas emissions and preventing the rise in global temperature through agreements such as The Paris Agreement. Any steps taken to reduce residential energy consumption will help to achieve those goals.

Smart thermostats could be a solution to reducing energy consumption, as numerous studies have shown that these thermostats do in fact reduce home energy consumption. Additionally, the technology within smart thermostats has proven to provide optimal occupant comfort, while still reducing energy consumption. In addition to providing comfort, these technologies take the human out of the picture. Many sustainable devices rely heavily on how the user uses them. By relying on technology instead of human actions, smart thermostats reduce the amount of human error often experienced with other sustainable devices, such as the programmable thermostat. These factors suggest that installing a smart thermostat is one easy step than many people can take to reduce energy usage and greenhouse gas emissions, ultimately leading to a more sustainable future.

=== Programs ===
Many housing corporations and smart thermostat developers realize the potential of smart thermostats to save energy, and have developed programs to advance sustainability through smarter technology. Ecobee promotes a sustainable future through its "A Better Tomorrow" program, in which the company donates time, data, and technology to ensure a brighter future. As part of this program, in January 2018, ecobee donated 776 ecobee thermostats to the Toronto Community Housing Corporation (TCHC) to help the city of Toronto advance their climate change action plan. This donation helps to improve the TCHC's goal of providing healthy, safe, and sustainable homes for the people of Toronto.

Another popular way that utility companies promote switching to a smart thermostat is through monetary incentives. The San Diego Gas & Electric company currently runs a program that offers participants a $50 e-gift card after switching to a smart thermostat. The Wisconsin Focus on Energy program partners with utility companies across Wisconsin to offer a $75 check to those who purchase a qualifying smart thermostat. Austin Energy, a utility company providing electricity to the city of Austin, Texas, offers a $25 rebate for each eligible smart thermostat that is purchased and installed. Pacific Gas and Electric Company (PG&E) offers smart thermostat rebates in California for residential and multifamily customers. Many other companies across the United States offer similar programs to incentive smart thermostats and more sustainable heating and cooling.

Upon installing a smart thermostat, there are additional programs that continue to promote sustainability and reduced energy consumption. The Nest Rush Hour Rewards program partners with utility companies across the United States to incentivize customers to set a higher or lower temperature during peak demand periods. Energy rush hours occur when everyone in a particular area turns on their heating or cooling at the same time, such as during a heat wave. This extra demand may require utility companies to run additional power plants, leading to more cost and carbon emissions. To avoid this, the Rush Hour Rewards program incentivizes customers to set a more efficient temperature that will reduce the amount of energy needed to be produced by the utility.

As more programs like these are created, smart thermostats will play an increasingly important role in reducing residential energy consumption. This reduction will lead to fewer greenhouse gas emissions, helping to create a more sustainable future.

== See also ==
- Home automation
  - List of home automation topics
- Testing, adjusting, balancing
- Internet of Things
- Web of Things
- Smart device
- Connected Device
