= OpenTherm =

Communications protocol for central heating systems

OpenTherm (OT) is a standard communications protocol used in central heating systems for the communication between central heating appliances and thermostatic controllers. As a standard, OpenTherm is independent of any single manufacturer. A controller from one manufacturer can in principle be used to control a boiler from another. However, OpenTherm controllers and boilers do not always work properly together. The OpenTherm standard comprises a number of optional features and some devices may include manufacturer-specific features. The presence or absence of such features may impair compatibility with other OpenTherm devices.

== History ==
OpenTherm Association
- Formation: 1996; 29 years ago
- Headquarters: Naarden, The Netherlands
- Website: https://www.opentherm.eu/

OpenTherm was founded in 1996 because multiple manufacturers needed a simple-to-use communicating system between room controller and boiler. It had to run, like the existing controllers, over the existing two wires, not polarity sensitive, without the use of batteries. For one British pound, Honeywell sold the first specification to the OpenTherm Association in November 1996. Shortly after, the first products appeared on the market. By 2008 the Association had grown to around 42 members and has regularly updated and improved the specification. Furthermore, the Association is also active in lobbying for the interests of its members and is also present at exhibitions like the ISH (Frankfurt) and the Mostra Convegno (Milan). As of 2016, the association has 53 members from around the world.

OpenTherm appliances are mainly used in Europe.

== Design ==
Communication is digital and bi-directional between the controller (primary) and the boiler (secondary). Various commands and kinds of information can be transferred; however, the most basic command is to set the boiler's target water temperature. OpenTherm makes use of a traditional untwisted 2-wire cable between controller and boiler. The protocol is not polarity sensitive: wires can be swapped. The maximum wiring length is 50 m up to maximum 2 x 5 ohm resistance. For backward compatibility with traditional switching thermostatic controllers, OpenTherm specified that if the two wires are connected together then the boiler will switch on.

Due to the secondary supplying power over the two wires, the controller does not require its own power connection.

The primary sends out a 32-bit signal every second, to which the secondary sends an acknowledgement message:

32-bit signal message components
| Number of bits | 1 | 1 | 3 | 4 | 8 | 16 | 1 |
|---|---|---|---|---|---|---|---|
| Description | Start bit | Parity bit | Message type | Reserved | Data ID | Data | Stop bit |
| Value | 0 | 1 if total number of 1 bits is uneven, otherwise 0 | | 0000 | | | 0 |

=== Multi Point to Point ===
Specification 3.0 also describes how more than two devices can be connected by OpenTherm. Whilst OpenTherm is a point-to-point connection, an extra device (gateway) is added between the primary and the secondary. This gateway has 1 secondary and 1 (or more) primary interfaces. The gateway controls which data is passed to each secondary. An application example is a room temperature controller connected to a heat recovery unit, which is connected to a boiler. The heat recovery unit is then functioning as gateway. In another possible configuration, a thermostat or room controller is connected to a sequencer with further Opentherm interfaces connected to more than one boiler. The room controller can be a standard unit, since it only 'sees' one heat-producer. The sequencer includes additional software to increase or decrease the number of running boilers to match the actual heat demand. The sequencer also needs a sensor to measure the temperature of the combined output from the boilers and usually would also control a main circulation pump. What happens after a fault occurs (resequencing remaining units, passing fault messages through for display on the room controller, etc.) is also part of the sequencer functionality. (The hydraulic design of such a system must also take account of different combinations of boilers running at the same time: a Low Loss Header / Hydraulic Separator is usually included to combine the flows from the boilers.)

== Variants ==
=== OpenTherm/Plus (OT/+) ===
The two wires are used both to supply power to the controller and for bidirectional digital communication between the controller and the boiler. The minimum available power is 35 mW. When using OpenTherm Smart Power this can, by primary request, also be 136 mW (medium power) or 255 mW (high power). The controller transmits to the boiler by sending a Manchester-encoded sequence in the Voltage domain. The boiler transmits data back to the controller in the current domain. OpenTherm specifies a maximum communications interval of one second. The data in the communication packet is functionally specified and is called OpenTherm-ID (OT-ID). 256 OT-IDs are available, 128 are reserved for OEM use. The other 128 are reserved, 90 of them are functionally specified. (OT specification v3.0)

=== OpenTherm/Light (OT/-) ===
When OT/- is used the primary generates a PWM voltage signal, representing the boiler water temperature set point. The boiler current signal indicates the status of the boiler: error, no error. Due to the limited possibilities OT/- is rarely used .

=== OpenTherm Smart Power ===
On June 16, 2008, OpenTherm specification 3.0 was approved by the association. This version introduces OpenTherm Smart Power. The primary can request the secondary to change the available power to low, medium or high power. With this primary manufacturers can add more functionality to their products (backlight or extra sensors).

== Certification ==
Manufacturers are allowed to market OpenTherm products when they comply with some rules of the OpenTherm association. Most importantly the manufacturer has to be an OpenTherm member, and the product must be tested by an independent testing body. By handing over the test report and a Declaration of Conformity to the association, the manufacturer is allowed to use the OpenTherm logo.

== See also ==
- Building automation
- HVAC
- HVAC control system
- KNX (standard)
- Programmable thermostat
- Radiator
