= Direct digital control =

Control of a system by computer

Direct digital control is the automated control of a condition or process by a digital device (computer). Direct digital control takes a centralized network-oriented approach. All instrumentation is gathered by various analog and digital converters which use the network to transport these signals to the central controller. The centralized computer then follows all of its production rules (which may incorporate sense points anywhere in the structure) and causes actions to be sent via the same network to valves, actuators, and other heating, ventilating, and air conditioning components that can be adjusted.

== Overview ==
Central controllers and most terminal unit controllers are programmable, meaning the direct digital control program code may be customized for the intended use. The program features include time schedules, setpoints, controllers, logic, timers, trend logs, and alarms.

The unit controllers typically have analog and digital inputs, that allow measurement of the variable (temperature, humidity, or pressure) and analog and digital outputs for control of the medium (hot/cold water and/or steam). Digital inputs are typically (dry) contacts from a control device, and analog inputs are typically a voltage or current measurement from a variable (temperature, humidity, velocity, or pressure) sensing device. Digital outputs are typically relay contacts used to start and stop equipment, and analog outputs are typically voltage or current signals to control the movement of the medium (air/water/steam) control devices.

== History ==
An early example of a direct digital control system was completed by the Australian business Midac in 1981-1982 using R-Tec Australian designed hardware. The system installed at the University of Melbourne used a serial communications network, connecting campus buildings back to a control room "front end" system in the basement of the Old Geology building. Each remote or Satellite Intelligence Unit (SIU) ran 2 Z80 microprocessors whilst the front end ran eleven Z80's in a Parallel Processing configuration with paged common memory. The z80 microprocessors shared the load by passing tasks to each other via the common memory and the communications network. This was possibly the first successful implementation of a distributed processing direct digital control.

== Data communication ==
When direct digital controllers are networked together they can share information through a data bus. The control system may speak 'proprietary' or 'open protocol' language to communicate on the data bus. Examples of open protocol language are Building Automation Control Network (BACnet), LonWorks (Echelon), Modbus TCP and KNX.

== Integration ==
When different direct digital control data networks are linked together they can be controlled from a shared platform. This platform can then share information from one language to another. For example, a LON controller could share a temperature value with a BACnet controller. The integration platform can not only make information shareable, but can interact with all the devices.

Most of the integration platforms are either a PC or a network appliance. In many cases, the HMI (human machine interface) or SCADA (Supervisory Control And Data Acquisition) are part of it. Integration platform examples, to name only a few, are the Tridium Niagara AX, Trend Controls, TAC Vista, CAN2GO and the Unified Architecture i.e. OPC (Open Connectivity) server technology used when direct connectivity is not possible.

== Applications ==
=== In heating, ventilating, and air conditioning ===
Direct digital control is often used to control heating, ventilating, and air conditioning devices such as valves via microprocessors using software to perform the control logic. Such systems receive analog and digital inputs from the sensors and devices and, according to the control logic, provide analog or digital outputs.

These systems may be mated with a software package that graphically allows operators to monitor, control, alarm and diagnose building equipment remotely.

=== Plant growth ===
Direct digital control can be applied to optimize plant growth in a growth chamber.

=== Motor ===
Using an algorithm based on optimal control theory, it is possible to control the speed of an induction motor using a microcontroller.

== See also ==
- Building automation
- Fieldbus
- GE Fanuc Intelligent Platforms
- Industrial control systems
- Plant process and emergency shutdown systems
- Programmable logic controller
- Safety instrumented system
