= Damper (flow) =

Valve or plate for regulating airflow

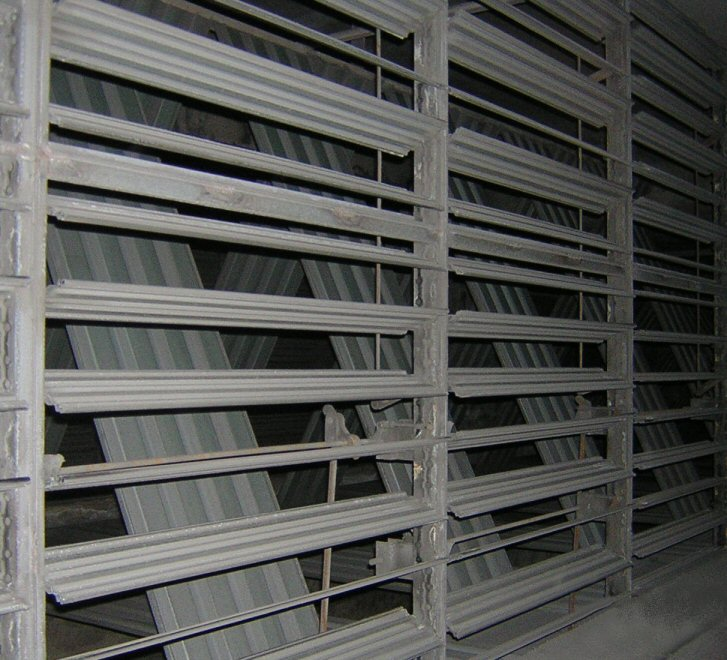
Opposed blade dampers in a mixing duct.

A damper is a valve or plate that stops or regulates the flow of air inside a duct, chimney, VAV box, air handler, or other air-handling equipment. A damper may be used to cut off central air conditioning (heating or cooling) to an unused room, or to regulate it for room-by-room temperature and climate control - for example, in the case of Volume Control Dampers. Its operation can be manual or automatic. Manual dampers are turned by a handle on the outside of a duct. Automatic dampers are used to regulate airflow constantly and are operated by electric or pneumatic motors, in turn controlled by a thermostat or building automation system. Automatic or motorized dampers may also be controlled by a solenoid, and the degree of air-flow calibrated, perhaps according to signals from the thermostat going to the actuator of the damper in order to modulate the flow of air-conditioned air in order to effect climate control.

In a chimney flue, a damper closes off the flue to keep the weather and animals (e.g. birds) out and warm or cool air in. This is usually done in the summer, but also may be done in the winter between uses. In some cases, the damper may also be partly closed to help control the rate of combustion. The damper may be accessible only by reaching up into the fireplace by hand or with a woodpoker, or sometimes by a lever or knob that sticks down or out. On a wood-burning stove or similar device, it is usually a handle on the vent duct as in an air conditioning system. Forgetting to open a damper before beginning a fire can cause serious smoke damage to the interior of a home, if not a house fire.

== Automated zone dampers ==
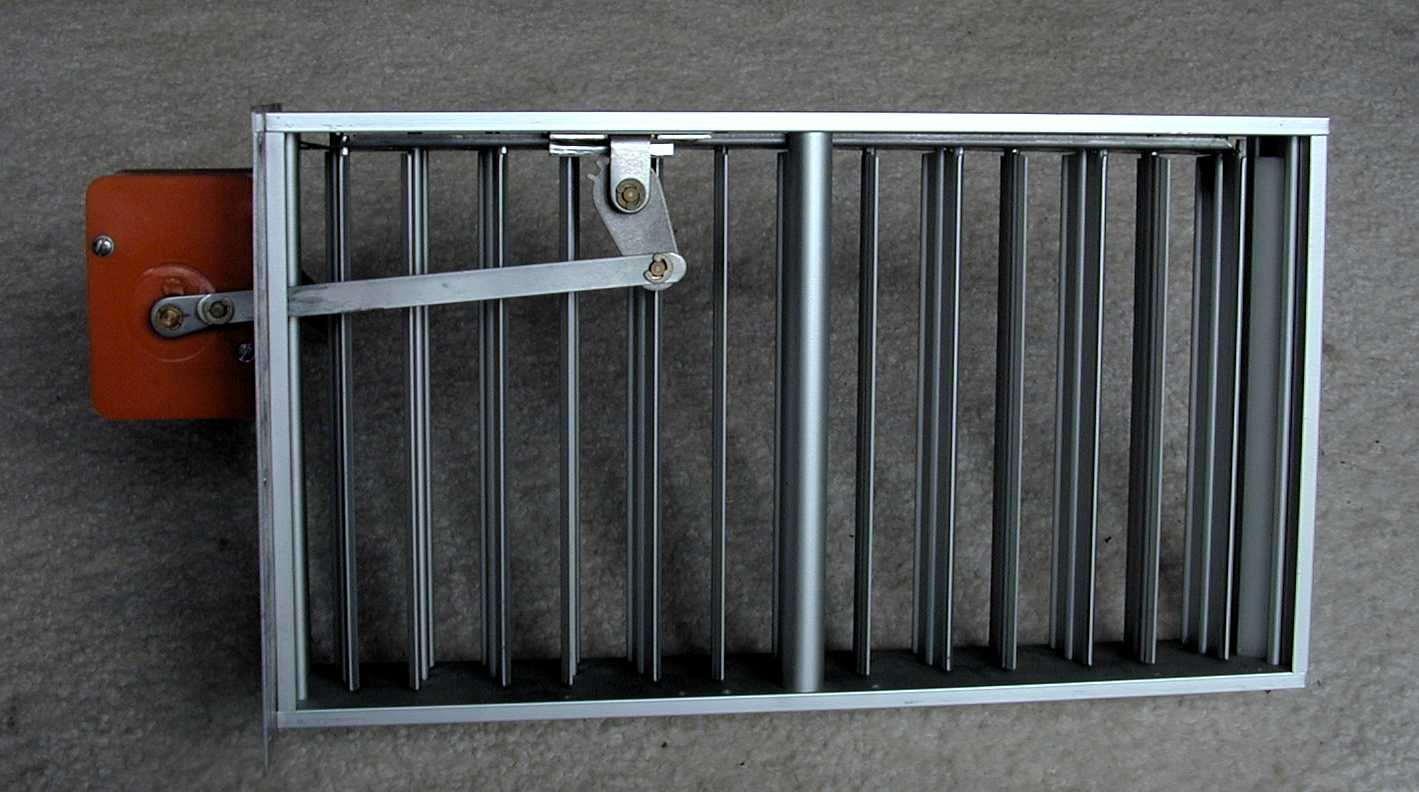
An opposed-blade, motor-closed, motor-opened zone damper. The damper is shown in the "open" position.

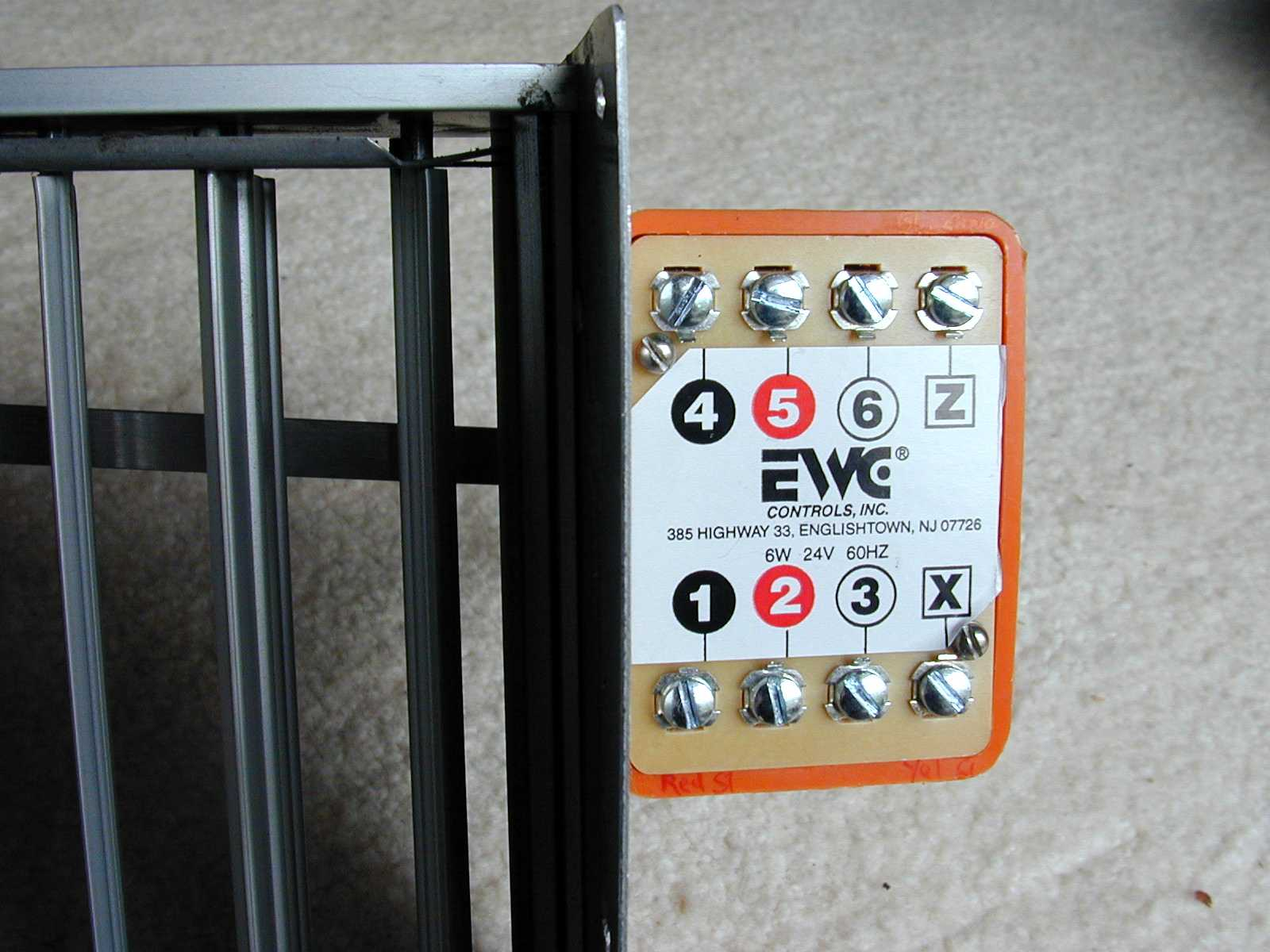
Close-up of the motor connections. This damper can switch the electrical power to control additional "slave" dampers, minimizing the electrical load on the damper's control circuitry and power transformer

A zone damper (also known as a Volume Control Damper or VCD) is a specific type of damper used to control the flow of air in an HVAC heating or cooling system. In order to improve efficiency and occupant comfort, HVAC systems are commonly divided up into multiple zones. For example, in a house, the main floor may be served by one heating zone while the upstairs bedrooms are served by another. In this way, the heat can be directed principally to the main floor during the day and principally to the bedrooms at night, allowing the unoccupied areas to cool down.

Zone dampers as used in home HVAC systems are usually electrically powered. In large commercial installations, vacuum or compressed air may be used instead. In either case, the motor is usually connected to the damper via a mechanical coupling.

For electrical zone dampers, there are two principal designs.

In one design, the motor is often a small shaded-pole synchronous motor combined with a rotary switch that can disconnect the motor at either of the two stopping points ("damper open" or "damper closed"). In this way, applying power to the "open damper" terminal causes the motor to run until the damper is open while applying power at the "close damper" terminal causes the motor to run until the damper is closed. The motor is commonly powered from the same 24 volt AC power source that is used for the rest of the control system. This allows the zone dampers to be directly controlled by low-voltage thermostats and wired with low-voltage wiring. Because simultaneous closure of all dampers might harm the furnace or air handler, this style of damper is often designed to only obstruct a portion of the air duct, for example, 75%.

Another style of electrically powered damper uses a spring-return mechanism and a shaded-pole synchronous motor. In this case, the damper is normally opened by the force of the spring but can be closed by the force of the motor. Removal of electrical power re-opens the damper. This style of damper is advantageous because it is "fail safe"; if the control to the damper fails, the damper opens and allows air to flow. However, in most applications "fail safe" indicates the damper will close upon loss of power thus preventing the spread of smoke and fire to other areas. These dampers also may allow adjustment of the "closed" position so that they only obstruct, for example, 75% of the air flow when closed.

For vacuum-operated or pneumatically operated zone dampers, the thermostat usually switches the pressure or vacuum on or off, causing a spring-loaded rubber diaphragm to move and actuate the damper. As with the second style of electrical zone dampers, these dampers automatically return to the default position without the application of any power, and the default position is usually "open", allowing air to flow. Like the second style of electrical zone damper, these dampers may allow adjustment of the "closed" position.

Highly sophisticated systems may use some form of building automation such as BACnet or LonWorks to control the zone dampers. The dampers may also support positions other than fully open or fully closed and are usually capable of reporting their current position and, often, the temperature and volume of the air flowing past the smart damper.

Regardless of the style of damper employed, the systems are often designed so that when no thermostat is calling for air, all dampers in the system are opened. This allows air to continue to flow while the heat exchanger in a furnace cools down after a heating period completes.

=== Comparison to multiple furnaces/air handlers ===
Multiple zones can be implemented using either multiple, individually controlled furnaces/air handlers or a single furnace/air handler and multiple zone dampers. Each approach has advantages and disadvantages.

=== Multiple furnaces/air handlers ===
Advantages:

- Simple mechanical and control design ("SPST thermostats")
- Redundancy: If one zone furnace fails, the others can remain working

Disadvantages:

- Cost. Furnaces cost much more than zone dampers
- Power consumption. Operating furnaces draw power whereas a zone damper only draws power while in motion from one state to the other (or, in some cases, a very small amount of power while holding closed)

=== Zone dampers ===
Advantages:

- Cost.
- Power consumption.

Disadvantages:

- New US residential building codes require permanent access to dampers through ceiling access panels.
- Zone dampers are not 100% reliable. Most styles of motor-to-open/motor-to-closed electrically operated zone dampers aren't "fail safe" (that is, they do not fail to the open condition). However, zone dampers that are of the "Normally Open" type are fail-safe, in that they will fail to the open condition.
- No inherent redundancy for the furnace. A system with zone dampers is dependent upon a single furnace. If it fails, the system becomes completely inoperable.
- Low total flow when only some dampers are open can cause inefficient operation.
- Supply and return ducts need dampers to avoid pressurization of portions of the building.
- The system can be harder to a design, requiring both "SPDT" thermostats (or relays) and the ability of the system to withstand the fault condition whereby all zone dampers are closed simultaneously.

Pneumatic actuation is preferred for these dampers. It is easier to provide zone-classified solenoid valves for pneumatic actuation, as compared to electrical actuation. The physical size of such solenoid valves have come down very considerably over the years.

== Fire dampers ==
Fire dampers are fitted where ductwork passes through fire compartment walls and fire curtains as part of a fire control strategy. In normal circumstances, these dampers are held open by means of fusible links. When subjected to heat, these links fracture and allow the damper to close under the influence of the integral closing spring. The links are attached to the damper such that the dampers can be released manually for testing purposes. The damper is provided with an access door in the adjacent ductworks for the purpose of inspection and resetting in the event of closure.

== See also ==
- Zone valve
- Variable air volume (VAV)
- Testing, adjusting, balancing
- Air-mixing plenum
