= Alerton =

US manufacturer of building automation systems

- Formerly: Alerton Technologies
- Type: Private
- Industry: Building automation, HVAC, Intelligent building
- Founded: 1981; 45 years ago in Bellevue, Washington
- Founders: Al Lucas; Clair Jenkins; Tony Fassbind
- Headquarters: Lynnwood, Washington
- Key people: Mike Noble (Business Leader & Sales Director)
- Products: Building Management System, Thermostats, Programmable thermostat
- Website: www.alerton.com

Alerton (sometimes misspelled "Allerton") is a United States company based in Lynnwood, Washington. It is a manufacturer of building automation systems for heating, ventilation and air conditioning HVAC equipment.

The company was founded in 1981 in Bellevue by three entrepreneurs from whom the company's name was derived: Al Lucas, Clair Jenkins and Tony Fassbind. Lucas was Jenkin's father-in-law; Fassbind was the company's chief executive officer and chief technologist; while Jenkin's succeeded Lucas as president after his retirement, and serviced as the lead business developer.

Alerton's entry into the building automation systems market was through the application of direct digital controls in their products, a technology which had in the early 1980s been largely overlooked by the market's major players. The company developed their own control protocol, Ibex, and transitioned to using the license-free BACnet protocol beginning in 1995; in adopting BACnet, the company became the first to implement this protocol across an entire product line in the controls industry.

Alerton was acquired by the UK building supplies company Novar in 2003; as part of the acquisition, "Alerton Technologies" became "Alerton", a wholly owned subsidiary of Novar Controls and part of Novar's Intelligent Building Systems division. The acquisition was aimed at being a growth opportunity for both firms, and Novar recognized Alerton as "a pioneer in the development of the BACnet protocol".

Alerton became part of Honeywell in 2005 when its parent company, Novar, was acquired. In Honeywell, Alerton is part of the company's Automation and Controls group.
