= Plenum =

Plenum may refer to:

- Plenum chamber, a chamber intended to contain air, gas, or liquid at positive pressure
- Plenism, or Horror vacui (physics) the concept that "nature abhors a vacuum"
- Plenum (meeting), a meeting of a deliberative assembly in which all members are present; contrast with quorum
- Plenum space, enclosed spaces (in buildings) used for airflow
- Plenum cable, electrical wire permitted in plenum spaces per building codes
- Plenum Publishing Corporation, a publisher of scientific books and journals
- Plenum (physics), a space completely filled with matter
- Undergravel filters, in aquarium filtration, an open space under a layer of gravel or sand
- Air-mixing plenum, a place where ducts meet

== See also ==
- Plenary (disambiguation), the related adjective
