= Google Silicon Initiative =

Custom silicon design project

The Google Open Silicon Initiative is an initiative launched by the Google Hardware Toolchains team to democratize access to custom silicon design. Google has partnered with SkyWater Technology and GlobalFoundries to open-source their Process Design Kits for 180nm, 130nm and 90nm process. This initiative provides free software tools for chip designers to create, verify and test virtual chip circuit designs before they are physically produced in factories. The aim of the initiative is to reduce the cost of chip designs and production, which will benefit DIY enthusiasts, researchers, universities, and chip startups. The program has gained more partners, including the US Department of Defense, which injected $15 million in funding to SkyWater, one of the manufacturers supporting the program.
