= IP500 Alliance =

Building automation manufacturers association

- Formation: 2007 Berlin, Germany
- Type: Non-governmental organization
- Purpose: Building automation, safety
- Headquarters: Berlin, Germany
- Region served: Worldwide
- Executive director: Helmut Adamski
- Website: ip500.org

The IP500 Alliance, with its seat in Berlin, Germany, is an international organization of manufacturers of products and systems for building automation and system integration. Members include Bosch, Honeywell, Siemens, Omron and Toyota Tsusho. A goal of the IP500 Alliance is to define and develop a wireless, manufacturer-neutral and safe data transfer IP500 communication platform for large buildings.

The alliance was created in 2007 in Berlin. Since 2011 the IP500 Alliance has been a registered non-profit organization.
