= Robert Maxfield =

American entrepreneur

- Born: Robert Roy Maxfield; September 30, 1941; Detroit, Michigan, U.S.
- Died: August 13, 2024 (aged 82); Marble Falls, Texas, U.S.
- Education: Rice, BA 1963; Rice, BS 1964; Stanford, MSEE (1965); Stanford, PhD EE (1969)
- Known for: ROLM, co-founder (1968); Echelon, VP (2009-2010)
- Spouse: Katherine Maxfield
- Awards: Entrepreneur of the Year, Harvard Business School (1980), Rice Alumni Gold Medal Award 2025
- Scientific career
- Fields: Electrical engineering
- Thesis: Techniques for computing optimal controls for linear systems with inequality constraints (1969)
- Doctoral advisor: David G. Luenberger

Robert Maxfield (September 30, 1941 – August 13, 2024) was an American entrepreneur, electrical engineer, and philanthropist. He is best known for being a co-founder of the pioneering Silicon Valley company, ROLM. Maxfield and three former classmates from Rice University founded ROLM, growing it into a Fortune 500 company. After he retired from ROLM, he had a storied career in education, research, and philanthropy.

== Biography ==
=== Early life and education ===
Robert Roy Maxfield was born on September 30, 1941, in Detroit, Michigan. He was the oldest of Mary Jane and Jack Maxfield's three children. His father was a surgeon, who joined the Army Medical Corps during World War II. After the war, his family settled in Wichita Falls, Texas, where he spent the remainder of his childhood.

During high school, Maxfield developed an interest in computers. In the late 1950s, there was limited access to computers, and in his small hometown, there were none. Despite this, he turned his interest into a science project in which he built a rudimentary computer, a two-bit adder, using aviation relays. He excelled in math and science in high school, and decided to study engineering in college. He graduated from Wichita Falls High School in 1959.

When selecting a university, Maxfield considered MIT, CalTech, and Rice University. He was attracted to Rice for its strong science and engineering programs, tuition-free policy, and location in Houston, which was a five- to six-hour drive from his home. He had also spent time in Houston during the summers, when he competed in Junior Olympics swimming events. He was offered a swimming scholarship by the University of Texas, but chose Rice, where he believed he would receive a better education.

Rice's engineering program required students to complete both engineering and liberal arts courses, which led to a five-year undergraduate course of study for Maxfield. He appreciated how this integration of liberal arts made him a more well-rounded person. He earned both a Bachelor of Arts and a Bachelor of Science in Electrical Engineering, completing his degrees in 1963 and 1964, respectively; graduating at the top of his class. Of his undergraduate experience at Rice, Maxfield said, "It's an excellent school for an engineer. But one of the characteristics was you work your butt off. I mean it was really hard and ... you learned to focus, to work hard, to ...manage your time," (Note: Maxfield attributed the success of ROLM, in part, to all of its founders having been engineering undergraduates at Rice University. See the Roundtable with ROLM founders, starting at 1:16:45. Maxfield's specific comments about Rice start at 1:19:01 ("And, doing a startup company, man that was just like being back at Rice."))

Maxfield knew he wanted to both go to graduate school and work with computers. He considered MIT and Stanford University, which both had co-op programs with IBM, providing an opportunity to work and go to graduate school. He was offered a job with IBM in San Jose, California. He moved to California, and continued his studies in electrical engineering, earning a Master of Science in Electrical Engineering (M.S.E.E.) in 1966. He completed his Ph.D. in 1969. His doctoral dissertation, with Professor David G. Luenberger as thesis advisor, was titled "Techniques for Computing Optimal Controls for Linear Systems with Inequality Constraints." Nearing completion of his Ph.D., he realized he would rather work on practical applications instead of research. However, his job interviews and job offers for a new Ph.D. were for doing research. A conversation with Ken Oshman would set him on his career path for the next 15 years.

=== Marriage and family ===
Maxfield and Melinda Harrison were married in 1964, soon after his graduation from Rice. The couple moved to California where he would be pursuing his graduate studies. They had two daughters in 1968 and 1971. Robert and Melinda divorced. Their youngest daughter died from leukemia in 1986, at age 14.

Maxfield married Katherine "Kathie" Hullmann in 1990, who had been the Product Marketing Manager at ROLM. She would later write a book, Starting Up Silicon Valley, documenting the history of ROLM.

=== Death and legacy ===
Maxfield died on August 13, 2024, near his home in Marble Falls, Texas, at the age of 82.

Maxfield Hall at Rice University, the home of Department of Statistics, is named in honor of Robert and Katherine Maxfield, whose Maxfield Foundation donated funds for the renovation of the former "Mechanical Hall".

== Career ==
=== ROLM ===
In 1968, fellow Rice alumni Gene Richeson, Ken Oshman, and Walter Loewenstern were discussing starting a new company that would focus on building computers. None of them had computer experience, so they tapped Maxfield, who was about to complete his Ph.D. at Stanford. In 1969, Maxfield, with Richeson, Oshman, and Loewenstern, founded ROLM Corporation,. (Note: The name ROLM is formed from the surnames of its founders - "R" - Gene Richeson , "O"- Ken Oshman, "L"- Walter Loewenstern, "M"- Robert Maxfield.) He served as a director and the executive vice-president. The company initially developed military computers, and later expanded into telecommunications equipment.

In 1984, ROLM was acquired by IBM in one of the largest acquisitions in the technology industry at the time. Maxfield served as Vice President of ROLM, under IBM, until he retired in 1988.

=== New professional and intellectual pursuits ===
After leaving IBM, Maxfield set off on a new path for his professional and intellectual pursuits.

Maxfield served the board of directors for several corporations in 1980s and 1990s, including the Software Publishing Corporation (1980–1994), Saratoga National Bank (1982–1986), Vadis Corporation (1989–1991), Knowledge Revolution (1992–1998), and Fogdog Sports (1996–2000).

From 1988, Maxfield mentored Stanford Ph.D. students as a Consulting Professor for the Management Science and Engineering (MS&E) Department, which "focus[ed] on the interface of engineering, business, and public policy. He created and taught "Business Management for Engineers" from 1989 to 1991, recognizing that the traditional engineering course of study did not provide basics in business.

Maxfield joined Kleiner Perkins venture capital firm as a venture partner from 1989 to 1992. Ironically, when Maxfield and his partners in ROLM were looking for venture capital for their start-up company ROLM, they approached Gene Kleiner and were turned down. (Note: From Maxfield's interview with the Computer History Museum: "...there were a few venture capitalists in the Bay Area that we talked to, and one of them, for example, was Gene Kleiner, at that time it was Kleiner and Sheldon Roberts I believe...he had a little venture capital thing that became Kleiner Perkins....they turned us down.")

Since 1991, Maxfield had been involved with the Santa Fe Institute (SFI), a multi-disciplinary science and technology think tank, as both a researcher and a trustee. With SFI, he collaborated with a number of scientist from differing disciplines, publishing their research in journals and in books. His final paper was on the topic of evolutionary economics. (See "Selected publications")

From 2009 to 2010, he was Senior Vice President, Products for Echelon Corporation, which designed control networks. (Note: When Maxfield joined Echelon as a senior VP in 2009, Ken Oshman was president of Echelon.) Maxfield served as Interim President when Oshman became ill. When Ron Sege joined Echelon as President in 2010, Maxfield then served as a Director at Echelon.

== Service and philanthropy ==
=== Maxfield Foundation ===
In 1985, Maxfield and his first wife established the Maxfield Foundation to support scientific research and education. The Foundation's donations were primarily to support cancer research, especially leukemia; with some grants given to other projects. In February 2024, the Foundation filed their "final" tax return for the year 2023, having distributed their final grant in 2023.

=== Rice University ===
From 1994 to 2012, Maxfield served on the Rice Board of Trustees, heading the finance committee for many years. He also served on the advisory board for the School of Engineering.

Maxfield was an early investor in OpenStax, a project that he invested much of his time supporting — "The OpenStax project is what I've spent the most time on, and feel the most satisfaction from." OpenStax, a non-profit of Rice University, provides free, peer-reviewed textbooks to AP and college students and a platform to enhance learning.

=== Santa Fe Institute ===
Since 1991, Maxfield had been involved with the Santa Fe Institute (SFI), a multi-disciplinary science and technology think tank focused on complexity, as both a researcher and a trustee. He served on their Board of Trustees, SFI's longest serving trustee, from 1992 until his death.

== Selected publications ==
Maxfield has published a number of interdisciplinary papers, including:

- 1995:Luenberger, David; Maxfield, R. R. (1995). "Computing economic equilibria using benefit and surplus functions". Computational Economics. 8: 47–64. doi:10.1007/BF01298497. (proposes new algorithms for the computation of equilibria for private ownership competitive economies,based the zero-maximum principle and the zero-minimum principle)
- 1995: Lane, D.; Malerba, Franco; Maxfield, R. (1995). "Choice and action". Journal of Evolutionary Economics. 6: 43–76. doi:10.1007/BF01202372. (argues that rational choice provides an inadequate foundation for a theory of economic action)
- 1996: Lane, David Avra; Maxfield, R. (1996). "Strategy under complexity: Fostering generative relationships". Long Range Planning. 29 (2): 215–231. doi:10.1016/0024-6301(96)00011-8. ("illustrate[s] the ideas advanced in this article with a story about the entry of ROLM into the PBX market in 1975")
- 2004: Lane, David; Maxfield, Robert (2004). "Ontological uncertainty and innovation". Journal of Evolutionary Economics. 15: 3–50. doi:10.1007/s00191-004-0227-7. hdl:11380/305253. (explores the relationship between ontological uncertainty and innovation)
- 2008: Lane, David; Maxfield, Robert; Read, Dwight; Van der Leeuw, Sander (2008). "Chapter 1: From Population to Organization Thinking". Complexity Perspectives in Innovation and Social Change, Methodos Series 7. doi:10.1007/978-1-4020-9663-1_2. hdl:11380/711209.
- 2009: Lane, David; Maxfield, Robert (2009). "Building a New Market System: Effective Action, Redirection and Generative Relationships". Complexity Perspectives in Innovation and Social Change. pp. 263–288. doi:10.1007/978-1-4020-9663-1_10. hdl:11380/711216. ISBN 978-1-4020-9662-4.
- 2009: Lane, David; Maxfield, Robert (2009). "Building a New Market System: Effective Action, Redirection and Generative Relationships". Complexity Perspectives in Innovation and Social Change. pp. 263–288. doi:10.1007/978-1-4020-9663-1_10. hdl:11380/711216. ISBN 978-1-4020-9662-4.
- 2016: Wagner, Andreas; Ortman, Scott; Maxfield, Robert (2016). "From the primordial soup to self-driving cars: Standards and their role in natural and technological innovation". Journal of the Royal Society Interface. 13 (115). doi:10.1098/rsif.2015.1086. PMC 4780566. PMID 26864893. (applies the notion of standards "to the biochemical 'technologies' of nature, where objects like DNA and proteins, as well as processes like the regulation of gene activity are highly standardized")
