= LonTalk =

Protocol optimized for control

LonTalk is a networking protocol originally developed by Echelon Corporation for networking devices over media such as twisted pair, powerlines, fiber optics, and RF. It is popular for the automation of various functions in industrial control, home automation, transportation, and buildings systems such as lighting and HVAC (such as in intelligent buildings). The protocol has now been adopted as an open international control networking standard in the ISO/IEC 14908 family of standards. Published through ISO/IEC JTC 1/SC 6, this standard specifies a multi-purpose control network protocol stack optimized for smart grid, smart building, and smart city applications.

== LonWorks ==
LonTalk is part of the technology platform called LonWorks.

== Protocol ==
The protocol is defined by ISO/IEC 14908.1 and published by ISO/IEC JTC 1/SC 6. The LonTalk protocol has also been ratified by standards setting bodies in the following industries & regions:

- ANSI Standard ANSI/CEA 709.1 - Control networking (US)
- EN 14908 - Building controls (EU)
- GB/Z 20177.1-2006 - Control networking and building controls (China)
- IEEE 1473-L - Train controls (US)
- SEMI E54 - Semiconductor manufacturing equipment sensors & actuators (US)
- IFSF - International forecourt standard for EU petrol stations
- OSGP - A widely use protocol for smart grid devices built on ISO/IEC 14908.1

The protocol is only available from the official distribution organizations of each regional standards body or in the form of microprocessors manufactured by companies that have ported the standard to their respective chip designs.

== Security ==
An April 2015 cryptanalysis paper claims to have found serious security flaws in the OMA Digest algorithm of the Open Smart Grid Protocol, which itself is built on the same EN 14908 foundations as LonTalk. The authors speculate that "every other LonTalk-derived standard" is similarly vulnerable to the key-recovery attacks described.

== See also ==
- BACnet -- A building automation and control protocol standardized by ASHRAE.
- List of automation protocols
