= Crossbar =

Crossbar may refer to:

== Structures ==
- Latch (hardware), a post barring a door
- Top tube of a bicycle frame
- Crossbars often are used for transporting or towing vehicles with and AWD or 4WD system to prevent damage to the differential. Crossbars are less preferable than other tow methods because of the risk the vehicle dismounting the bars during transport. Many crossbars are designed to have minor flex to allow for more stable turning, but other forms of transportation are still preferable.
- Crossbar, the horizontal member of various sports goals
- Crossbar, a horizontal member of an electricity pylon

== Other ==
- In electronics, crossbar switch, a switch connecting multiple inputs to multiple outputs in a matrix manner
- In typeface anatomy, crossbar refers to some types of horizontal strokes
- Crossbar (computer hardware manufacturer), a company manufacturing resistive random-access memory
- Crossbar (film), a 1979 Canadian television film
