= Ken Oshman =

American entrepreneur

- Born: Malin Kenneth Oshman; July 9, 1940; Kansas City, Missouri, US
- Died: August 6, 2011 (aged 71); Palo Alto, California, US
- Education: Rice, BA 1962; Rice, BS 1963; Stanford, MS EE (1965); Stanford, PhD EE (1968)
- Known for: Co-founder of ROLM; CEO of Echelon
- Spouse: Barbara (née Daily) Oshman (m. 1962)
- Awards: National Academy of Engineering (1982)
- Scientific career
- Fields: Electrical engineering
- Thesis: Studies of Optical Frequency Parametric Oscillation
- Doctoral advisor: Steve Harris

Malin Kenneth Oshman (July 9, 1940 – August 6, 2011) was an American entrepreneur, electrical engineer, and Silicon Valley pioneer, best known for co-founding ROLM Corporation and as CEO of Echelon Corporation. Oshman and three former classmates from Rice University founded ROLM, growing it into a Fortune 500 company. After he left ROLM, he became chief executive officer of Echelon Corporation.

Oshman’s work in telecommunications and control networking contributed to the development of digital telephone switching systems and technologies used in the smart grid.

In addition to his business endeavors, Oshman was involved in various philanthropic and leadership roles, contributing to educational and community initiatives. He served on boards and advisory councils for organizations such as Stanford University, Rice University, and several technology companies.

== Early life and education ==
Malin Kenneth Oshman was born on July 9, 1940, in Kansas City, Missouri, and grew up in Rosenberg, Texas, near Houston. He attended St. Mark's School of Texas, a private college-preparatory school for boys, and then went on to attend Rice University in Houston, Texas. At Rice, he earned a B.A.degree, summa cum laude in 1962, and a B.S. in electrical engineering in 1963. He went on to graduate school, at Stanford University in California, where he earned a master's degree (1965) and Ph.D (1968) in electrical engineering.

== Career ==
After completing his studies, Oshman worked for several years as an engineer at Philco Corporation, an American company that specialized in electronics and defense systems. In 1969, he co-founded ROLM Corporation with three of his former classmates from Rice University — Gene Richeson, Walter Loewenstern, and Robert Maxfield. The company initially developed rugged military computers, but later expanded into telecommunications equipment.

In 1984, ROLM was acquired by IBM for $1.8 billion.

After leaving ROLM, in 1988, Oshman became the CEO of Echelon Corporation, a company that specialized in creating energy-efficient technologies for homes and buildings. Under his leadership, Echelon became involved with the smart grid industry, developing technologies that helped to improve the efficiency and reliability of energy systems.

== Philanthropy and community involvement ==
Oshman was an advocate for science education and worked to promote the importance of science, technology, engineering, and math (STEM) education for young people. In 2001, he donated $35 million to Rice University, which led to the creation of the Oshman Engineering Design Kitchen, a state-of-the-art facility for engineering students to design and build prototypes. His family endowed a $10 million dollar gift to the Palo Alto Jewish Community Center, which now bears their namesake.

Oshman also supported the Stanford Graduate School of Business, where he established the Oshman Family Professorship in Management, and the Palo Alto Medical Foundation, where he served on the board of directors. He was also a major donor to the San Francisco Museum of Modern Art, and supported a number of other arts organizations.

== Death ==
Oshman died on August 6, 2011, at the age of 71.
