= SkyWater Technology =

American semiconductor manufacturer

SkyWater Technology, Inc.
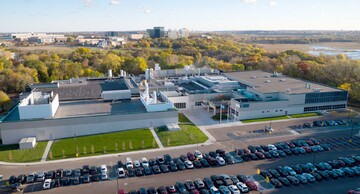
- SkyWater building
- Type: Public
- Traded as: Nasdaq: SKYT
- Industry: Semiconductor manufacturer
- Founded: 2017; 9 years ago
- Headquarters: Bloomington, Minnesota, U.S.
- Key people: Thomas Sonderman
- Products: Semiconductor; Silicon chips Silicon wafer
- Parent: IonQ
- Website: skywatertechnology.com

SkyWater Technology, Inc. is an American semiconductor engineering and fabrication foundry, based in Bloomington, Minnesota. It is the only US-owned pure-play silicon foundry. It was acquired by IonQ in July, 2026.

== History ==
The company was formed in 2017, when private equity firm Oxbow Industries acquired Cypress Foundry Solutions, a microelectronics fabricator that was previously a subsidiary of California-based Cypress Semiconductor Corp.

In early 2021, SkyWater acquired an additional chip factory in Osceola, Florida, repurposing the University of Central Florida NeoCity fabrication facility into a second fabrication site. It expanded its facility and added 100 new jobs in 2021, partially due to funding from the Minnesota Department of Employment and Economic Development. SkyWater Technology acquired Infineon Technologies' 200mm semiconductor fab in Austin, Texas on June 30, 2025, adding approximately 1,000 employees to SkyWater's workforce.

=== Initial public offering ===
SkyWater Technology filed an initial public offering with the U.S. Securities and Exchange Commission in March 2021.

=== U.S. infrastructure investment ===
SkyWater has been cited as an example of the infrastructure the Biden administration is investing in. On April 12, 2021, President Joe Biden held up a silicon wafer created by SkyWater while saying chips represents a form of infrastructure.

On July 20, 2022, Skywater announced plans to invest 1.8 billion dollars into a manufacturing facility in West Lafayette, Indiana, but the company has since backed out of those plans due to a shortage of funding. The facility is within Purdue University's Discovery Park District.

=== Acquisition ===
On January 26, 2026, quantum computing company IonQ agreed to buy Skywater for $1.8 billion. On July 31, 2026, the acquisition was approved.

== Technology ==
SkyWater produces semiconductor chips using 90-nanometer and 130-nanometer process technology on equipment designed to handle 200-millimeter wafers of silicon. SkyWater works in the consumer, industrial, military & defense, and automotive industries. SkyWater is a Department of Defense-accredited Trusted supplier, part of the DOD's efforts to secure a supply chain within the United States.

In 2020, SkyWater collaborated with Efabless and Google to create the first open source chip manufacturing program. SkyWater's 130 nm process design kit has been made available under the Apache License.

On August 21, 2021, SkyWater announced an expanded partnership with Rockley Photonics Holdings, focused on Rockley's health monitoring solution.

In 2023, SkyWater partnered with Israeli semiconductor IP company Weebit Nano to offer resistive random-access memory (ReRAM) on their 130 nm process.
