= Constant air volume =

Type of heating, ventilating, and air-conditioning (HVAC) system

Constant air volume (CAV) is a type of heating, ventilating, and air-conditioning (HVAC) system. In a simple CAV system, the supply air flow rate is constant, but the supply air temperature is varied to meet the thermal loads of a space.

Most CAV systems are small, and serve a single thermal zone. However, variations such as CAV with reheat, CAV multizone, and CAV primary-secondary systems can serve multiple zones and larger buildings.

In mid- to large-size buildings, new central CAV systems are somewhat rare. Due to fan energy savings potential, variable air volume (VAV) systems are more common. However, in small buildings and residences, CAV systems are often the system of choice due to their simplicity, low cost, and reliability. Such small CAV systems often have on/off control, rather than supply air temperature modulation, to vary their heating or cooling capacities.

There are two types of CAV systems that are commonly in use to modify the supply air temperature: the terminal reheat system and the mixed air system.

The terminal reheat system cools the air in the air handling unit down to the lowest possible needed temperature within its zone of spaces. This supplies a comfortable quality to the space, but wastes energy.

The mixed air system has two air streams, typically one for the coldest and one for the hottest needed air temperature in the zone. The two air streams are strategically combined to offset the space's load. The mixed air system option is not as proficient at controlling the humidity, yet it does do well at controlling the temperature.
