= ROLM =

Defunct American computer and telecommunications manufacturer

ROLM Corporation
- Industry: Telecommunications
- Founded: 1969; 57 years ago in Santa Clara, California
- Defunct: 1998

ROLM Corporation was a Silicon Valley technology company founded in 1969 by four electrical engineers: Gene Richeson, Ken Oshman, Walter Loewenstern, and Robert Maxfield. The company is best known for creating a computerized telephone switching system. Their initial product was the first portable, off-the-shelf ruggedized computer for the U.S. military. In 1973, the company later expanded into telecommunications with the development of the ROLM CBX, a computerized telephone switching system. ROLM’s "Great Place to Work" (GPW) culture became a model for other companies. ROLM was acquired by IBM in 1984.

When IBM partnered with the company, ROLM's military computer arm ("Mil-Spec") was sold to Loral Corporation and later to Lockheed Martin in 1996 as Tactical Defense Systems. IBM's ROLM division was later half sold to Siemens AG in 1989, whereupon the manufacturing and development became wholly owned by Siemens and called ROLM Systems, while marketing and service became a joint venture of IBM with Siemens, called ROLM Company. After nearly 30 years, phone products with the name "ROLM" were discontinued in the late 1990s, as sales dropped in markets dominated by new technology with other products or other companies.

== Products ==
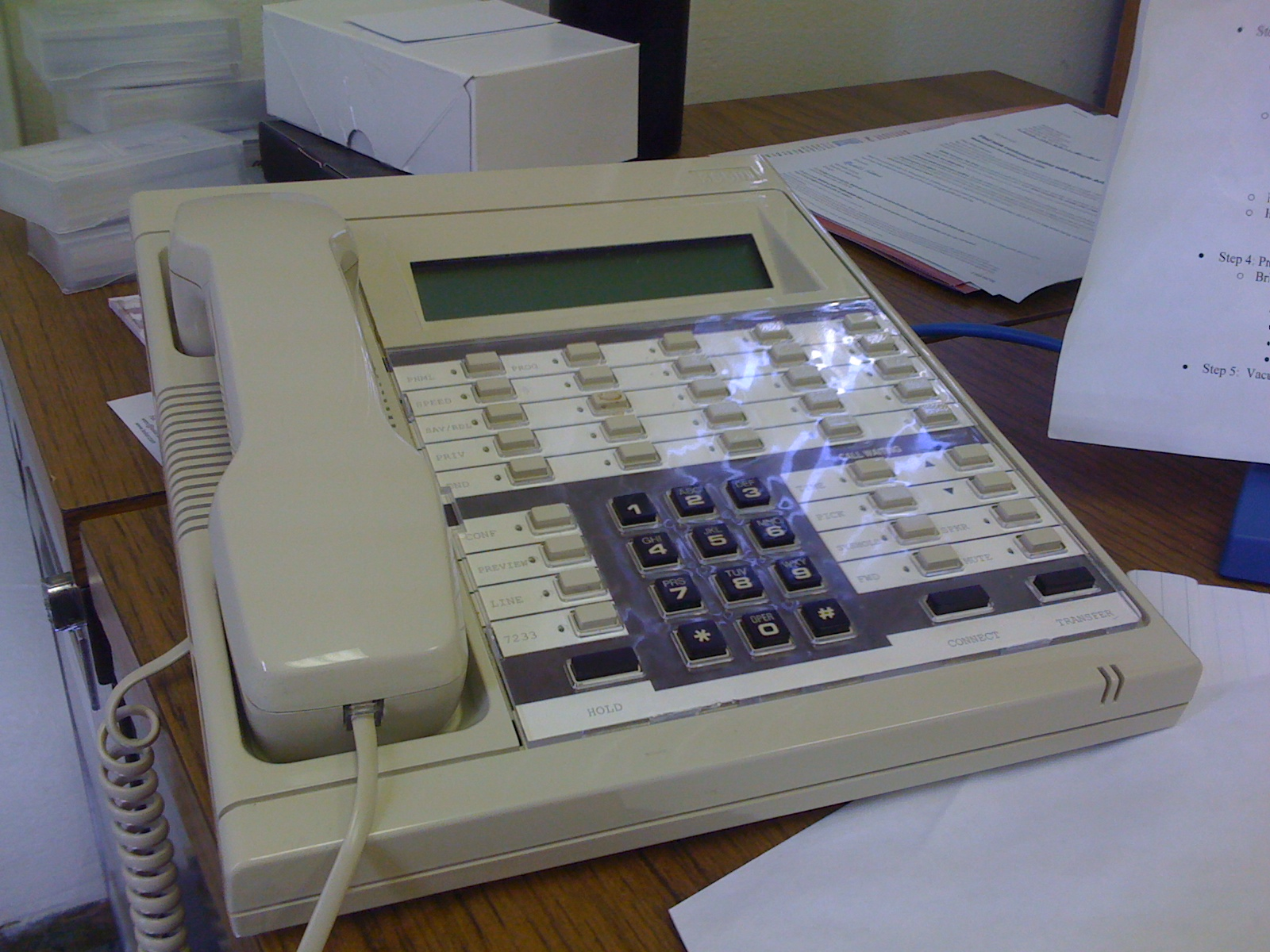
A RolmPhone 400.

The ROLM corporation had two distinct operations, depending on the application of the associated hardware, with a cross blending of technologies from one division to the other.

=== Military hardware ===
The company first produced rugged "mil-spec" (military specification) computer systems running Data General software. The company divisionalized in 1978, becoming both Rolm Mil-Spec Computers and Rolm Telecom. The Telecom division spent much of the considerable profit realized by the Mil-Spec Computer division over the ensuing 1980s trying to penetrate the convoluted phone-interconnect business.

The first computer system was the 1601 Ruggednova Processor, announced at the 1969 Fall Joint Computer Conference with deliveries beginning in March 1970. In the military it was designated the AN/UYK-12(V) It was a licensed implementation of the Data General Nova architecture. It consisted of a 5-board processor card set and core or read only MOS memory in 4K increments up to 32K in a standard ATR box which contained the power supply and 14 card slots. The 1601 was a popular machine with RCA TIPI. The processor was developed into a smaller-form card set as the ALR-62 and ultimately into a single-card version as the ALR-46A, both sold to Dalmo Victor.

The Models 1602 and 1603 soon followed with greater capability and more memory - the ROLM 1602 was used on the AN/MLQ-34 TACJAM jamming system as the primary system computer and controller. The newer 1606 was leveraged into the Raytheon (Goleta) AN/SLQ-32 naval shipboard electronic warfare system for signal identification purposes and into units sold to Singer Librascope. Bob Maxfield and Alan Foster were responsible for the design of the early processor chassis until Art Wellman from Sylvania was brought in to take the computers to their next level mechanically. Both half-ATR and full-ATR-sized chassis were developed for a wide array of defense applications.

The 1602B and 2150 I/O boxes were developed and standardized expressly for the Army ILS program and were top sellers at the time. The Rolm 1602 was used on AN/MLQ-34 'TACJAM' as the primary mission computer. The 1666 was leveraged into the GLCM (Ground Launched Cruise Missile) and SLCM (Surface Launched Cruise Missile) hardware for McDonnell Douglas (MDAC), St. Louis, and the follow-on 1666B was incorporated into MDAC's Tomahawk Weapons Control System (TWCS). Despite developing most products with Rolm's own money, the substantial increase in military sales in the 1980s caused the loss of the commercial exemption enjoyed in the early years. This required all product-pricing to be negotiated directly with the DoD, so margins eroded somewhat. Some 32-bit machines (versus 16-bit) were developed into the Hawk/32 computer and sold well. Engineering in the latter years scrambled to come up with a new product line as the military was enticed into ruggedized commercial computer systems by Rugged Digital, and Rolm worked on a militarized version of Mercury Computer's Digital Signal Processor. Brisk sales of the DG-based computers continued up to the time the ROLM Mil-Spec Computer division was closed in June 1998.

=== Commercial hardware ===
The Telecom division leveraged the 1603 processor into the heart of its original CBX. Over time, the company began to focus on digital voice, and produced some of the earliest examples of all-digital voice equipment, including Computerized Branch Exchanges (CBXs) and digital phones. Two of the most popular telecom systems were the ROLM CBX and ROLM Redwood (PBX and Key Systems Unit (KSU) models, respectively). The CBX was meant to directly compete with Northern Telecom's SL-1, AT&T Dimension telephone systems and other computerized digital-voice systems being developed at the time. By 1980, ROLM had shot past AT&T in number of systems deployed to become the #2 PBX in North America. The Redwood, often called the "Deadwood" by many ROLM techs because it never caught on, was intended to compete with the Nortel Norstar Key System. When Siemens bought ROLM from IBM and introduced its "newer" models, which were renamed Siemens switches, the early ROLM phone switches were widely pressed into service as old technology (though a number of 8000 and 9751-9005 CBXs remain online at some companies), but the digital phone handsets were quite valuable for those expanding their phone networks. The later ROLM 9200 (actually a Siemens HCM200 Hybrid system renamed) was more competition for the leading Key Systems as the 9200 had intensive Least Call Routing software, which the Redwood did not. The company also produced one of the first commercially successful voicemail systems, PhoneMail. Digital ROLM telephones, called ROLMphones, were unique from other telephones in many ways, one of which was a lack of a physical switchhook button. Instead, the handset contains a small magnet which triggers a switch in the phone base. The opening or closing of this switch lets the phone and system know if the phone is on hook (not in use) or off-hook (in use).

== History ==
=== Start up to Fortune 500 ===
The company name "ROLM" was formed from the first letters of the founders names: Gene Richeson, Ken Oshman, Walter Loewenstern, and Robert Maxfield. The four had studied electrical engineering at Rice University and earned graduate degrees at Stanford University. At Rice, Oshman and Loewenstern were members of Wiess College. Not an original founder, Leo Chamberlain was hired and became very much the soul of ROLM, advancing progressive workplace ideas such as GPW (Great Place to Work). The Old Ironsides Drive campus (ROLM Campus-Santa Clara, CA) was equipped with a swimming pool, openspace park areas, a cafeteria and recreation center.

ROLM originally made flight computers for the military and heavy commercial industries such as oil exploration (Halliburton). Beginning in the early 1970s, International Paper Company bought a significant number of the 1602 series computers. These became the environmentally-hardened base for that company's in-house-developed process control system, which informally became known as the dual-ROLM. Later, in an attempt at diversification, ROLM themselves branched off into energy management by buying a company producing an early version of such a system and the telecom industry by designing the CBX, internally running a 1603 computer. It quickly outsold AT&T, who at the time had not come out with a digital PBX, and became #2 behind the Nortel SL-1 switch by 1980. At one point, ROLM was poised to overtake Nortel as the leader in PBX sales in North America. By 1984, ROLM was a Fortune 500 company. (Note: "By 1984—‚merely fifteen years later—ROLM was a Fortune 500 company with worldwide offices and a park-like campus. That same year, IBM bought the company in the biggest deal Silicon Valley had ever seen." —Katherine Maxfield)

=== Acquired by IBM ===
In May 1982, IBM purchased 15% of ROLM; They continued to acquire ROLM stock until September of 1984, reaching 23% ownership. IBM partnered with, and in 1984 acquired ROLM Corporation in Santa Clara, California. The 'Mil-Spec' Computer portion of the business was sold to Loral Corporation when IBM's Federal Systems Division was determined by government regulatory agencies to be already too large and dominant in military markets to retain ROLM Mil-Spec. Ultimately, the Mil-Spec group ended up in the hands of Lockheed Martin as Tactical Defense Systems.

In the telecom equipment market, ROLM started to lose pace with Nortel, due to product issues, and it never recovered. The 9751 CBX, which has IBM's name on it, was initially a successful product; but when ISDN service became more affordable, IBM did not update the 9751 to integrate correctly with ISDN. Nortel leaped ahead on that issue alone; AT&T (now Avaya) and others gained ground and started to overtake ROLM.

=== Acquired by Siemens ===
IBM's ROLM division was half sold to Siemens AG in 1989, whereupon manufacturing and development became wholly owned by Siemens and called ROLM Systems, while marketing and service became a joint venture of IBM with Siemens, called ROLM Company. By 1992, Siemens bought out IBM's share in ROLM and later changed its name to SiemensROLM Communications. However, the die was cast, and the downturn (across the telecom sector) continued. The ROLM name was eventually dropped in the late 1990s, though Siemens still retained the trademark.

=== End of ROLM ===
Secondary vendors still offer support for ROLM phone systems, including repair services for broken phones and sales of refurbished units and Phonemail systems. Many systems have remained in use in large-scale universities, institutions and some corporations (Entergy, School of the Art Institute of Chicago, Huntsman, The Southern Company, the Santa Fe railroad [now part of BNSF], etc.), which were large-scale ROLM users from the early days.

The Great America Campus was leveled in 2014, and is now a parking lot for the adjacent Levi's Stadium. The River Oaks campus was leveled and is now high density housing. The Zanker campus remains with Broadcom as the tenant.
