= Plenary =

Plenary is an adjective related to the noun plenum carrying a general connotation of fullness.

Plenary may also refer to:

- Plenary session or meeting, the part of a conference when all members of all parties are in attendance
  - Plenary speaker, a speaker at a plenary session; distinguish from a sectional speaker
- Plenary power or plenary authority, the complete power of a governing body
- Plenary council, one of various councils of the Catholic Church
- Plenary indulgence, a type of religious indulgence
- Plenary Group, an Australian company
