= Weebit Nano =

Israeli semiconductor company

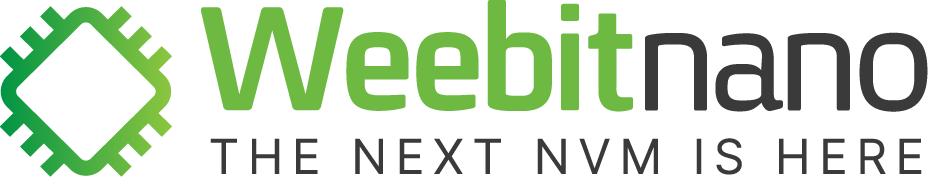
- Type: Public company
- Traded as: ASX: WBT
- Industry: Semiconductors
- Founded: 2015
- Headquarters: Hod Hasharon, Israel
- Key people: Coby Hanoch, CEO; David "Dadi" Perlmutter, Chairman of the Board
- Products: RERAM, non-volatile memory products
- Website: www.weebit-nano.com

Weebit Nano is a public semiconductor IP company founded in Israel in 2015 and headquartered in Hod HaSharon, Israel. The company develops Resistive Random-Access Memory (ReRAM or RRAM) technologies. Resistive Random-Access Memory is a specialized form of non-volatile memory (NVM) for the semiconductor industry. The company's products are targeted at a broad range of NVM markets where persistence, performance, and endurance are all required. ReRAM technology can be integrated in electronic devices like wearables, Internet of Things (IoT) endpoints, smartphones, robotics, autonomous vehicles, and 5G cellular communications, among other products. Weebit Nano's IP can be licensed to semiconductor companies and semiconductor fabs.

Initial productization began with embedded ReRAM products (memory arrays embedded in Systems-on-Chips (SoCs) and will eventually be expanded to include discrete ReRAM products built into individual chip packages.

== History ==
The company began as a startup in Israel in 2015, founded on the roots of research and patents developed by Professor James Tour of Rice University, with a primary goal of productizing this ReRAM technology.

In 2016 the company successfully merged with Radar Iron of Australia, giving the merged entity the Weebit Nano name trading on the Australian Securities Exchange under the symbol WBT.

In 2016 Weebit Nano and CEA-Leti signed a memory development partnership agreement for the development of ReRAM technologies. Since then, Weebit Nano has been working closely with CEA-Leti on further developments and enhancements to its base ReRAM technologies, where Weebit Nano has commercialization rights to their joint developments. In November 2020 the Weebit/Leti partnership was extended to include further enhancements to Weebit's ReRAM technology, further development of its embedded memory module, and development of a selector for the stand-alone memory market.

In November 2018, Weebit announced it was working with the NonVolatile Memory Research Group of the Indian Institute of Technology Delhi (IITD) on a project to research the use of Weebit's ReRAM technology for certain types of neuromorphic applications – used for artificial intelligence.

In January 2019, Weebit announced its collaboration with a team at the Polytechnic University of Milan, to test, characterize and implement its developed algorithms using Weebit's ReRAM. The goal of the project is to demonstrate the capability of ReRAM-based hardware in neuromorphic and artificial intelligence applications.

In February 2019, Weebit and the Technion – Israel Institute of Technology announced a collaboration to examine the possible use of ReRAM devices in a novel computing architecture that could speed up processing, memory transfer rate and memory bandwidth and decrease processing latency – while using less power.

In December 2019, XTX Technology and Weebit, verified the technical parameters of Weebit's ReRAM array in XTX's own labs. XTX successfully confirmed measurements on Weebit's NVM that were previously achieved at French research institute Leti.

In February 2020, Weebit signed a Letter of intent with SiEn (QingDao) Integrated Circuits Co., Ltd. (SiEn) to jointly investigate ways in which Weebit's technology can be used in SiEn's products.

In October 2020, Weebit, together with Leti, completed its technology stabilization process so that its technology is now ready for transfer to a production fab.

In September 2021, Weebit and SkyWater Technology announced an agreement to take Weebit's ReRAM to volume production. As part of the agreement, SkyWater has licensed Weebit's ReRAM technology to use as embedded Non-Volatile Memory in customer designs.

In September 2021, Weebit, together with Leti, produced, tested and characterized fully functional 1 Mb ReRAM arrays in a 28 nm FDSOI process on 300mm wafers.

Weebit demonstrated its ReRAM IP module publicly for the first time in June 2022.

Also in June, Weebit taped out demo chips integrating its embedded ReRAM module to SkyWater Technology's foundry. This was followed in November 2022 with Weebit receiving from SkyWater the first production wafers incorporating its embedded ReRAM technology from Skywater -- the first time silicon wafers of Weebit ReRAM have been received from a production fab.

In March 2023, Weebit and SkyWater announced availability of Weebit's first commercially available ReRAM IP product. The IP in SkyWater's S130 process targets applications in automotive, defense and beyond.

Weebit and SkyWater confirmed in June 2023 that Weebit ReRAM IP has been fully qualified for industrial temperatures employing SkyWater's 130nm CMOS (S130) process.

In October 2023, foundry DB HiTek licensed Weebit ReRAM for use in its customers' designs. Weebit ReRAM will be available in DB HiTek's 130nm BCD process.

Weebit and Efabless Corp. announced a collaboration in May 2024 giving Efabless chipIgnite customers access to Weebit's ReRAM to incorporate into design prototypes manufactured using SkyWater Technology's 130nm CMOS (S130) process.

Weebit licensed its ReRAM technology to tier-1 semiconductor supplier onsemi in January 2025. The Weebit ReRAM IP will be integrated into the onsemi Treo platform to provide embedded NVM.

Weebit signed a design license agreement with its first product customer, a US-based company that plans to incorporate Weebit's technology into select security-related applications.

In December 2025, Texas Instruments (TI) licensed Weebit ReRAM for embedded processing semiconductors in advanced process nodes.

In March 2026, Weebit ReRAM was selected for use in a project funded by the Republic of Korea's government aimed at advancing ultra-low-power analog compute in memory (ACiM) technology for AI applications.

Weebit launched its Weebit Matrix In-Memory Compute (IMC) Research Program in November 2026. The program provides researchers with access to real ReRAM silicon to explore new AI computing architectures.

== Leadership ==
Weebit Nano has been led by CEO Coby Hanoch since 2017.

In addition to CEO Coby Hanoch, the Weebit Nano board of directors includes:

- David "Dadi" Perlmutter (chairman), who is also chairman of the board for Teramount and the Israel Innovation Institute and was previously EVP, Chief Product Officer and GM of the Intel Architecture Group.
- Yoav Nissan Cohen, (non-executive director), who is also the CEO and founder of Zullavision and was previously President, Co-CEO, Chairman of Tower Semiconductor.
- Atiq Raza, (non-executive director), who is also executive chairman of Virsec Systems and previously held C-level positions at AMD and Raza Microelectronics.
- Ashley Krongold (non-executive director), CEO of the Krongold Group and previously a founding member of Investec Bank Australia.
- Naomi Simson (non-executive director), founder of RedBallon and co-founder of Big Red Group, who also sits on boards including Big Red Group, Australian Payments Plus, Colonial First State, University of Melbourne Economics and Business Faculty, and Cerebral Palsy Research Foundation.
- Ann Templeman-Jones (non-executive director), who also currently sits on the boards of New South Wales Treasury Corporation (TCorp), Trifork AG and Erilyan Pty Ltd.

== Technology ==
Weebit Nano produces resistive random-access memory (ReRAM) which is a specialized type of random-access memory that maintains its state (and data) even if the device loses power. ReRAM is used in specialized environments where data must be preserved despite environmental challenges, such as aerospace, transportation and medical environments. There are two primary types of ReRAM, Conductive Bridge ReRAM (CBRAM) and Oxygen Vacancy ReRAM (OxRAM). Weebit Nano has productized OxRAM in its designs, and OxRAM is generally viewed to have better retention properties compared to CBRAM.

When fabricating the semiconductor wafers, memory technologies can be integrated during the 'front-end-of-line' (FEOL) process which happens in the early phase or later in the later phases during the back-end-of-line (BEOL) process. Weebit Nano's ReRAM can be more easily integrated into fabrication flows because it happens during the later BEOL layers instead of the earlier FEOL layers. There are two primary technologies that are used to fabricate transistors onto wafers, bulk CMOS and FD-SOI. Weebit Nano utilizes the CMOS-compatible process where the materials enable rapid development and integrating into any fab through the most common deposition techniques and tools.

Since 2016, Weebit Nano has collaborated on developing ReRAM technologies with CEA-Leti of France, one of the largest nanotechnology research institutes in Europe. The two organizations have collaborated on the 40 nm and 130 nm technology nodes.

Weebit and Leti have also shown a neuromorphic demo for Artificial Intelligence (AI) inference tasks where memory circuits are meant to mimic the actions of a human brain. The areas of focus for CEA-Leti and Weebit Nano as of November 2020 are around further enhancements to Weebit's ReRAM technology.

Other key technical milestones include:

- November 2017 production of working 40 nm SiOx RRAM cell samples, with measurements performed on those cells on various wafers verifying the ability of its memory cells to maintain their memory behavior.
- June 2018 demonstration of a working 1Mbit ReRAM array manufactured using a 40 nm process technology
- August 2018 production of the first packaged units containing memory arrays based on Weebit's ReRAM technology
- February 2020 demonstration of Spiking Neural Network using ReRAM
- October 2020 completion of the technology stabilization process so that Weebit's technology is ready for transfer to a production fabrication plant
- September 2021 production, testing and characterization of fully functional 1 Mb ReRAM arrays in a 28 nm FDSOI process on 300mm wafers
- December 2021 silicon demonstration wafers integrating Weebit's embedded ReRAM module
- January 2022 demonstration of Weebit's first crossbar ReRAM arrays
- March 2022 working with CEA-Leti to design an IP memory module integrating a multi-megabit ReRAM block targeting 22nm FD-SOI process
- October 2022 completed full technology qualification of its ReRAM module manufactured by its R&D partner CEA-Leti
- January 2023 worked with CEA-Leti and CEA-List to tape out a demo chip in a 22nm FD-SOI process
- March 2023 shared initial results of irradiation studies done with the Nino Research Group (NRG) in the University of Florida's Department of Materials Science and Engineering, demonstrating Weebit ReRAM maintains data integrity and memory functionality after being subjected to high doses of gamma irradiation
- March 2023 announced availability of its first ReRAM IP product in SkyWater Technology's 130nm CMOS manufacturing process, and demonstrated the module at the Embedded World industry conference
- July 2023 qualified its ReRAM up to 125 degrees Celsius, the temperature specified for automotive grade 1 NVMs
- November 2023 received the first wafers integrating its embedded ReRAM manufactured in GlobalFoundries' 22FDX process. In March 2024, Weebit announced it would be doing a live demo of its demo chip in 22FDX at Embedded World 2024.
- Weebit and SkyWater announced they have fully qualified Weebit's ReRAM module at temperatures up to 125 degrees Celsius on SkyWater's S130 platform
- Weebit announced it demonstrating the high endurance and reliability of its ReRAM in extended automotive conditions, including high temperatures of 150 degrees Celsius and extended program cycles.
- DB HiTek and Weebit announced tape-out of Weebit's ReRAM module in DB HiTek's 130nm BCD process.
- Weebit qualified its ReRAM module for AEC-Q100 for high-temperature automotive applications. The tests were conducted on a memory module comprising an array of 1T1R memory cells implemented in the SkyWater 130nm manufacturing process.
- Weebit successfully taped-out test chips featuring its embedded ReRAM module at onsemi’s 300mm production fab in East Fishkill, NY. onsemi’s next-generation products are expected to use this memory technology.
