= BACnet =

Communication protocol used for building automation

BACnet is a communication protocol for building automation and control (BAC) networks. It is defined by ANSI/ASHRAE 135 and ISO 16484-5.

BACnet was designed to allow communication of building automation and control systems for applications such as heating, ventilating, and air-conditioning control (HVAC), lighting control, access control, and fire detection systems and their associated equipment. The BACnet protocol provides mechanisms for computerized building automation devices to exchange information, regardless of the particular building service they perform.

== History ==
=== Protocol and standards ===
The development of the BACnet protocol began in June, 1987, in Nashville, Tennessee, at the inaugural meeting of the ASHRAE BACnet committee, known at that time as SPC 135P, "EMCS Message Protocol". The committee worked at reaching consensus using working groups to divide up the task of creating a standard. The working groups focused on specific areas and provided information and recommendations to the main committee. The first three working groups were the Data Type and Attribute Working Group, Primitive Data Format Working Group, and the Application Services Working Group.

BACnet became ANSI/ASHRAE Standard 135 in 1995. BACnet had an almost immediate impact on the HVAC controls industry. In 1996 Alerton announced a BACnet product line for HVAC controls, from the operator's workstation to small variable air volume (VAV) controllers. Automated Logic Corporation and Delta Controls soon followed suit.

The Method of Test for Conformance to BACnet was published in 2003 as BSR/ASHRAE Standard 135.1. BACnet became an international (ISO) standard as ISO 16484-5:2003. The Method of Test would soon follow as ISO 16484-6:2005. BACnet is under continuous maintenance by the ASHRAE Standing Standard Project Committee 135.

Current BACnet standards
Part	Code	Title	Notes
Protocol	ANSI/ASHRAE 135-2024	BACnet® - A Data Communication Protocol for Building Automation and Control Networks	
Protocol	ISO 16484-6:2026	Building automation and control systems (BACS) Part 6: Data communication conformance testing	Published: 2026-02

On July 12, 2017, BACnet reached a milestone with the issuance of the 1000th Vendor ID. Vendor IDs are assigned by ASHRAE and are distributed internationally. Those vendor identifiers can be viewed at the BACnet website.

=== BACnet committee ===
H. Michael (Mike) Newman, Manager of the Computer Section of the Utilities and Energy Management Department at Cornell University, served as the BACnet committee chairman until June, 2000, when he was succeeded by his vice-chair of 13 years, Steven (Steve) Bushby from NIST.

2000–The BACnet Manufacturers’ Association (BMA) is formed and soon opens the BACnet Testing Laboratory. The first president of BMA is James Lee. BACnet is translated into Chinese and Japanese. BMA sponsors first BACnet Interoperability Workshop (“PlugFest”) at NIST with 12 organizations attending. (PlugFest-2012 had 49 teams.) BACnet Testing Laboratories (BTL) was formed and James Butler was a founding manager of BTL.

During Steve Bushby's four-year term as committee chair the BACnet standard was republished twice, in 2001 and 2004, each time with new capabilities added to the standard. The 2001 version featured, among other things, extensions to support fire / life-safety systems.

In June, 2004, 17 years after the first BACnet meeting and back in Nashville, William (Bill) Swan (a.k.a. "BACnet Bill") from Alerton began his four-year stint as committee chair. During his term the number of committee working groups grew to 11, pursuing areas such as support for lighting, access control, energy utility/building integration, and wireless communications.

In January 2006 the BACnet Manufacturers Association and the BACnet Interest Group of North America combined their operation in a new organization called BACnet International.

In June 2008, in Salt Lake City, Dave Robin from Automated Logic Corporation took over the reins as the new committee chair after serving 4 years as vice chair. During Dave's term, 22 addenda were published for the 135-2008 standard and republished as 135-2010. Several addenda were published for 135-2010 and the standard was republished as 135-2012.

In June 2012, in San Antonio, Carl Neilson from Delta Controls took over the reins as the new committee chair after serving 4 years as vice chair. During Carl's term, 12 addenda were published for the 135-2012 standard and it was republished as 135-2016. Carl stepped down as chair in June 2015.

In June 2015, Bernhard Isler, from Siemens, became chair after serving 3 years as vice chair and 4 years as secretary. During Bernhard's term, 10 addenda were published for the 135-2016 standard. One addendum to 135.1-2013 was also published. Bernhard stepped down as chair in June 2018.

In June 2018, Michael Osborne from Reliable Controls, became chair after serving 3 years as secretary and 3 years as vice chair.

== Protocol overview ==
The BACnet protocol defines a number of services that are used to communicate between building devices. The protocol services include Who-Is, I-Am, Who-Has, I-Have, which are used for Device and Object discovery. Services such as Read-Property and Write-Property are used for data sharing. As of ANSI/ASHRAE 135-2016, the BACnet protocol defines 60 object types that are acted upon by the services.

The BACnet protocol defines a number of data link and physical layers, including ARCNET, Ethernet, BACnet/IP, BACnet/IPv6, BACnet/MSTP, point-to-point over RS-232, multidrop serial bus with token passing over RS-485, Zigbee, and LonTalk.

== BACnet objects ==
ANSI/ASHRAE 135-2020 specifies 62 standard object types:

- Access Credential
- Access Door
- Access Point
- Access Rights
- Access User
- Access Zone
- Accumulator
- Alert Enrollment
- Analog Input
- Analog Output
- Analog Value
- Audit Log
- Audit Reporter
- Averaging
- Binary Input
- Binary Lighting Output
- Binary Output
- Binary Value
- BitString Value
- Calendar
- Channel
- CharacterString Value
- Command
- Credential Data Input
- Date Value
- DatePattern Value
- DateTime Value
- DateTimepattern Value
- Device
- Elevator Group
- Escalator
- Event Enrollment
- Event Log
- File
- Global Group
- Group
- Integer Value
- Large Analog Value
- Life Safety Point
- Life Safety Zone
- Lift
- Lighting Output
- Load Control
- Loop
- Multi-state Input
- Multi-state Output
- Multi-state Value
- Network Port
- Notification Class
- Notification Forwarder
- Octetstring Value
- Positive Integer Value
- Program
- Pulse Converter
- Schedule
- Staging
- Structured View
- Time Value
- TimePattern Value
- Timer
- Trend Log
- Trend Log Multiple

== BACnet testing ==
BACnet Testing Laboratories ("BTL") was established by BACnet International to test products to BACnet standards and support compliance testing and interoperability testing activities and consists of BTL Manager and the BTL working group ("BTL-WG"). The general activities of the BTL are:

- Publishing the BTL Implementation Guidelines document
- Certifying the products per BACnet testing and BTL guidelines
- Supporting the activities of the BTL-WG
- Maintaining the BTL test packages
- Approving Testing Laboratories for BTL Testing

The BTL also provides testing services through BACnet Laboratories. The BTL Managers and BTL working groups of BACnet International administer the test Laboratories. All BTL-recognized BACnet Test Organizations are ISO 17025 accredited.

In January, 2017, a new BTL certification program was announced. Under this program, the work of the BTL and WSPCert (the European BACnet certification body) is merged. This merger forms a single point of testing for both the BTL Mark and the Certificate of Conformance.

== See also ==
- LonWorks
- Modbus
