= Air-mixing plenum =

Place where ducts meet

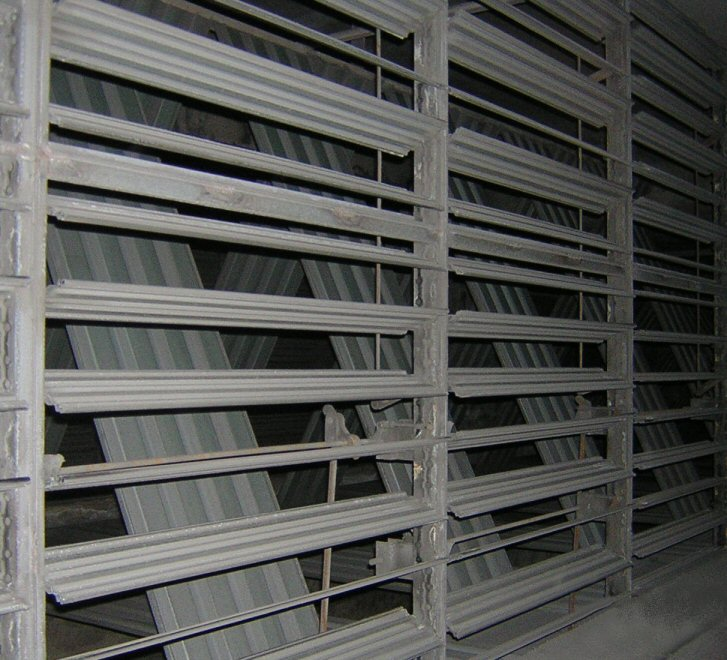
Opposed blade dampers in a mixing plenum, complete with mixing baffles.

An air-mixing plenum (or mixing box) is used in building services engineering and HVAC construction for mixing air from different ductwork systems.

== Usage ==
Air streams are mixed to save energy and improve energy efficiency by partially recirculating conditioned air.

The most common application for an air-mixing plenum is the mixing of return air (or extract air) with fresh air to provide a supply air mixture for onward distribution to the building or area which the ventilation system is serving. The air transferred from the return air stream to the supply air stream is termed recirculated air. All air not mixed is rejected to the atmosphere as exhaust air.

== Operation ==
The mixing plenum normally combines two air streams, and includes for three sets of dampers: one for the fresh air, one for the exhaust air, and a mixing damper between the two air streams. The mix of fresh air and recirculated air can thus be adjusted to suit the needs of the building's occupants. Most systems will use motorized dampers to control the air mixing, and controlled by the building management system (BMS), or controls system. Typically as the fresh air and exhaust air dampers are driven from 0% open to 100% open, the mixing damper will in turn be driven from 100% open to 0% open, so as to always ensure a constant volume of supply and extract air.

== Energy efficiency ==
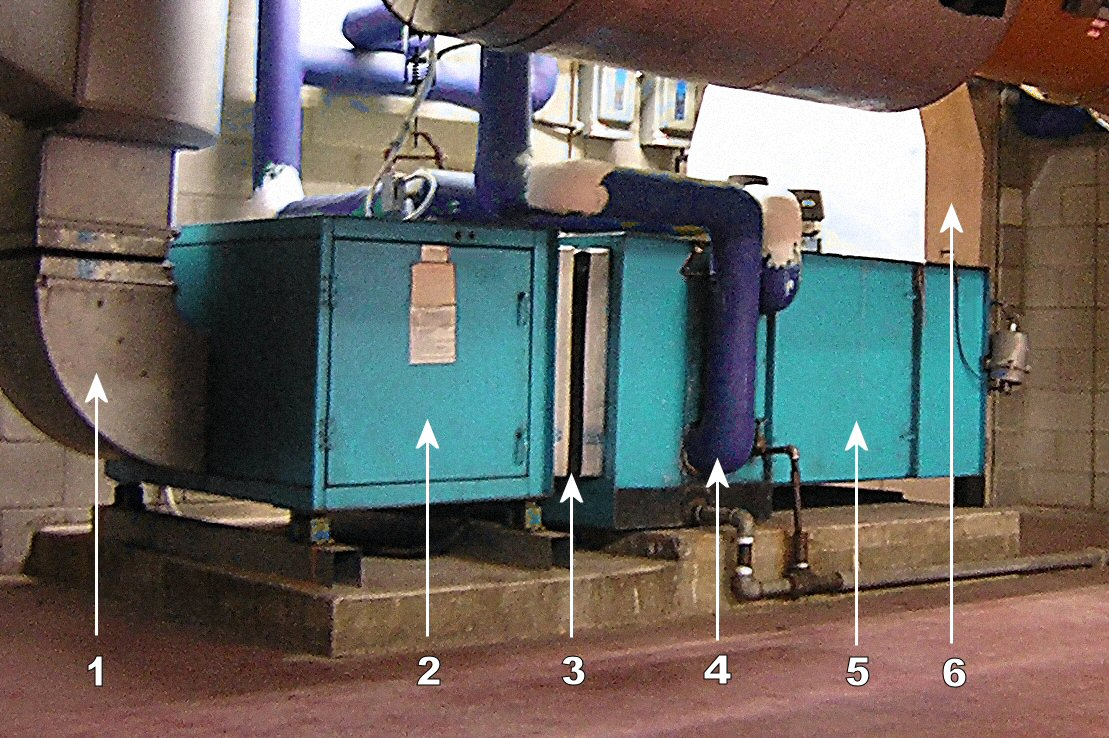
An air handling unit used for the heating and cooling air: (1) supply air (2) fan section (3) vibration isolator (4) cooling coil (5) filter (6) mixed air duct

Air supply to a building is generally performed by an air handling unit. The process may include filtering, heating, cooling, humidification, or dehumidification, all of which consume energy. Since building occupants demand less than 100% fresh air, only a fraction of that amount is admitted to the system, with and equal amount of treated air exhausted to the atmosphere; fresh air is mixed with conditioned air in a plenum.

Enhanced controls systems may monitor the return air quality or carbon dioxide concentration in order to automatically modulate the air mix for optimum energy efficiency while maintaining desired fresh air requirements. Such systems work very well in buildings where the occupancy rate can vary greatly throughout the day, or seasonally. Additionally, when outside air conditions are such, typically mid-season weather conditions, it may be that ambient temperatures are suitable for free cooling purposes. In such conditions the mixing damper will be set to close and the system use full fresh air for optimum energy efficiency. Where fresh air is not required, such as early morning pre-heat or pre-conditioning periods, the mixing damper can be automatically set to full recirculation, again for optimum energy efficiency.
