= Programmable metallization cell =

Non-volatile memory technology

The programmable metallization cell, or PMC, is a non-volatile computer memory developed at Arizona State University. This technology was developed to replace the widely used flash memory, providing a combination of longer lifetimes, lower power, and better memory density. Infineon Technologies, who licensed the technology in 2004, refers to it as conductive-bridging RAM, or CBRAM. CBRAM became a registered trademark of Adesto Technologies in 2011. NEC has a variant called "Nanobridge", and Sony calls their version "electrolytic memory".

== Description ==
PMC is a two-terminal resistive-memory technology developed at Arizona State University. PMC is an electrochemical metallization memory that relies on redox reactions to form and dissolve a conductive filament. The state of the device is determined by the resistance across the two terminals. The existence of a filament between the terminals produces a low-resistance state (LRS), while the absence of a filament results in a high-resistance state (HRS). A PMC device is made of two solid metal electrodes – one relatively inert (e.g., tungsten or nickel) and the other electrochemically active (e.g., silver or copper) – with a thin film of solid electrolyte between them.

== Device operation ==
The resistance state of a PMC is controlled by the formation (programming) or dissolution (erasing) of a metallic conductive filament between the two terminals of the cell. A formed filament is a fractal-tree-like structure.

=== Filament formation ===
PMC rely on the formation of a metallic conductive filament to transition to a low-resistance state (LRS). The filament is created by applying a positive voltage bias (V) to the anode contact (active metal) while grounding the cathode contact (inert metal). The positive bias oxidizes the active metal (M):

M → M^{+} + e^{−}

The applied bias generates an electric field between the two metal contacts. The ionized (oxidized) metal ions migrate along the electric field toward the cathode contact. At the cathode contact, the metal ions are reduced:

M^{+} + e^{−} → M

As the active metal deposits on the cathode, the electric field increases between the anode and the deposit. The evolution of the local electric field (E) between the growing filament and the anode can be simplistically related as
$$E = -\frac{V}{d},$$
where d is the distance between the anode and the top of the growing filament. The filament grows to connect to the anode within a few nanoseconds. Metal ions continue to be reduced at the filament until the voltage is removed, broadening the conductive filament and decreasing the resistance of the connection over time. Once the voltage is removed, the conductive filament remains, leaving the device in a LRS.

The conductive filament may not be continuous, but a chain of electrodeposit islands or nanocrystals. This is likely to prevail at low programming currents (less than 1 μA), whereas higher programming currents lead to a mostly metallic conductor.

=== Filament dissolution ===
A PMC can be "erased" into a high-resistance state (HRS) by applying a negative voltage bias to the anode. The redox process used to create the conductive filament is reversed, and the metal ions migrate along the reversed electric field to reduce at the anode contact. With the filament removed, the PMC is analogous to parallel-plate capacitor with a high resistance of several MΩ to GΩ between the contacts.

=== Device read ===
An individual PMC can be read by applying a small voltage across the cell. As long as the applied read voltage is less than both the programming and erasing voltage threshold, the direction of the bias is not significant.

== Technology comparison ==
=== CBRAM vs. metal-oxide ReRAM ===
CBRAM differs from metal-oxide ReRAM in that for CBRAM metal ions dissolve readily in the material between the two electrodes, while for metal-oxides, the material between the electrodes requires a high electric field causing local damage akin to dielectric breakdown, producing a trail of conducting defects (sometimes called a "filament"). Hence for CBRAM, one electrode must provide the dissolving ions, while for metal-oxide RRAM, a one-time "forming" step is required to generate the local damage.

=== CBRAM vs. NAND flash ===
The primary form of solid-state non-volatile memory in use is flash memory, which is finding use in most roles formerly filled by hard drives. Flash, however, has problems that led to many efforts to introduce products to replace it.

Flash is based on the floating gate concept, essentially a modified transistor. Conventional flash transistors have three connections: the source, drain and gate. The gate is the essential component of the transistor, controlling the resistance between the source and drain, and thereby acting as a switch. In the floating-gate transistor, the gate is attached to a layer that traps electrons, leaving it switched on (or off) for extended periods of time. The floating gate can be re-written by passing a large current through the emitter–collector circuit.

It is this large current that is flash's primary drawback, and for a number of reasons. For one, each application of the current physically degrades the cell, such that the cell eventually becomes unwritable. Write cycles on the order of 10^{5} to 10^{6} are typical, limiting flash applications to roles where constant writing is not common. The current also requires an external circuit to generate, using a system known as a charge pump. The pump requires a fairly lengthy charging process, so writing is much slower than reading; the pump also requires much more power. Flash is thus an "asymmetrical" system, much more so than conventional RAM or hard drives.

Another problem with flash is that the floating gate suffers leakage that slowly releases the charge. This is countered through the use of powerful surrounding insulators, but these require a certain physical size in order to be useful and also require a specific physical layout, which is different from the more typical CMOS layouts, which required several new fabrication techniques to be introduced. As flash scales rapidly downward in size, the charge leakage increasingly becomes a problem, which led to predictions of its demise. However, massive market investment drove development of flash at rates in excess of Moore's law, and semiconductor fabrication plants using 30 nm processes were brought online in late 2007.

In contrast to flash, PMC writes with relatively low power and at high speed. The speed is inversely related to the power applied (to a point, there are mechanical limits), so the performance can be tuned.

PMC, in theory, can scale to sizes much smaller than flash, theoretically as small as a few ion widths wide. Copper ions are about 0.75 angstroms, so line widths on the order of nanometers seem possible. PMC was promoted as simpler in layout than flash.

== History ==
PMC technology was developed by Michael Kozicki, professor of electrical engineering at Arizona State University in the 1990s. Early experimental PMC systems were based on silver-doped germanium selenide glasses. Work turned to silver-doped germanium sulfide electrolytes and then to the copper-doped germanium sulfide electrolytes. There has been renewed interest in silver-doped germanium selenide devices due to their high high-resistance state. Copper-doped silicon-dioxide glass PMC would be compatible with the CMOS fabrication process.

In 1996, Axon Technologies was founded to commercialize the PMC technology. Micron Technology announced work with PMC in 2002. Infineon followed in 2004. PMC technology was licensed to Adesto Technologies by 2007. Infineon had spun off memory business to its Qimonda company, which in turn sold it to Adesto Technologies. A DARPA grant was awarded in 2010 for further research.

In 2011, Adesto Technologies allied with the French company Altis Semiconductor for development and manufacturing of CBRAM. In 2013, Adesto introduced a sample CBRAM product in which a 1 megabit part was promoted to replace EEPROM.

NEC developed the so-called nanobridge technology, using Cu_{2}S or tantalumpentoxide as dielectric material. Hereby copper (compatible with copper metallization of the IC) makes the copper to migrate through Cu_{2}S or Ta_{2}O_{5}, making or breaking shorts between the copper and ruthenium electrodes.

The dominant use of this type of memory are space applications, since this type of memory is intrinsically radiation hard.

== See also ==
- Static random-access memory
