= International Forecourt Standards Forum =

Standardisation organisation

The International Forecourt Standards Forum is a UK-based European organisation which designs standards for connecting devices on a service station forecourt, such as dispensers, Tank Level Gauges, Price Signs, Car Washes and Outdoor Payment Terminals. In recent years additional standards have been added for Electronic Funds Transfer.

Formed in 1992 by a group of oil, pump and computer companies (including Agip, BP, Petrofina, Mobil and Texaco), the principle of IFSF is to create standards so that devices from different manufacturers can interoperate without having to redevelop interfaces:

... there was great concern within the retail oil industry regarding the different protocols or interfaces used by equipment manufacturers [...] Proprietary protocols effectively locked customers to individual suppliers – who could often not meet the changing computer system needs of the Oil Company.

A similar effort was undertaken earlier in Germany by oil companies and the Physikalisch-Technische Bundesanstalt, resulting in the European Petrol Station Interface (“EPSI”) standard, but this was not used much outside Germany.

Standards are only available to paid members of the IFSF organisation.

== Impact and deployment ==
IFSF forecourt equipment has seen considerable success in Europe and some growth markets like Russia and Eastern Europe, but is relatively rare elsewhere. It has not seen much usage in North America, although several member companies are based there. However, additional members have continued to join IFSF from many countries, in particular Shell who has pushed IFSF heavily in their European operations. Typically most major manufacturers offer an IFSF version of their equipment, though it may not be widely deployed. During 2007 IFSF was promoted heavily in China.

The newer EFT standards, "POS-EPS" based on XML technologies, are being used more widely.

Where IFSF is not used, a large variety of proprietary protocols are used. In many deployments, existing site equipment is converted to IFSF operation using a "protocol converter" or PCD, a small computer that accepts IFSF protocol and communicates to the device using its native, proprietary protocol. The PCD is most commonly fitted inside each dispenser, although it is possible for a single converter to convert many devices.

== How IFSF works ==
IFSF is more complex but more comprehensive than most proprietary protocols. The IFSF protocol has two independent layers; a device application protocol layer and a communications protocol layer. The application protocol is independent of the underlying communications layer. The communications protocol specification makes the link to the transport layer.

At the communication layer, LonWorks has been predominantly deployed because existing cables and cabling topology can be reused. Methods have been defined to use TCP/IP, but this requires higher specification cable and a point to point topology, and is therefore more suited to green field or rebuild service stations; in practice it is relatively rare.

The IFSF standards define messages sent and received by each type of device. The messages are designed to be expandable by specifying individual fields with types and lengths. The messages are grouped into various "databases" for the logical parts of each device, such as a nozzle at a pump.

Each type of device (dispenser, tank level gauge, price sign, carwash, etc.) defines its own set of databases and fields. Most devices also define a state machine to control the operation of the device. For example, the Dispenser device has the following states:

- Inoperative (during startup)
- Closed (not allowed to sell fuel, but otherwise working)
- Idle (normal operating state)
  - Authorised (nozzle in, but authorised for the next delivery of fuel)
- Calling (nozzle out, not yet authorised)
- Started (nozzle out and authorised, but no fuel flowing yet)
  - Suspended started (paused, before fuel flow)
- Fuelling (fuel flowing)
  - Suspended fuelling (paused, during fuel flow)
