= Echelon Corporation =

Technology company

- Company type: Subsidiary
- Industry: Building Automation; Home Automation; Industrial Automation; Transportation Automation; Automatic meter reading Remote Product Service Solutions
- Founded: 1988; 38 years ago
- Founder: Armas Clifford "Mike" Markkula Jr.
- Headquarters: Santa Clara, California, United States
- Key people: Ron Sege (president, CEO); Armas Clifford "Mike" Markkula Jr. (vice chairman, Director)
- Products: LonWorks Networking Platform; Pyxos Platform; Networked Energy Services i.LON 100 SmartServer; LonMaker 3.1 Integration Tool; LonScanner
- Parent: Adesto Technologies
- Website: www.echelon.com

Echelon Corporation was an American company which designed control networks to connect machines and other electronic devices, for the purposes of sensing, monitoring and control. Echelon was acquired in September of 2018 by Adesto Technologies, which itself was acquired in 2020 by Dialog Semiconductor. In 2021, Dialog Semiconductor became a subsidiary of Renesas Electronics.

== History ==
Echelon was founded in February 1988 in Palo Alto, California by Clifford "Mike" Markkula Jr. The chief executive was M. Kenneth Oshman. Echelon's LonWorks platform for control networking was released in 1990 for use in the building, industrial, transportation, and home automation markets. At its initial public offering on March 31, 1998, its shares were listed on the NASDAQ exchange with the symbol ELON and delisted September 2018 with the close of their acquisition by Adesto

Started in 2003, Echelon's Networked Energy Services system was an open metering service. Echelon provides the underlying network technology for the world's largest Advanced Metering Infrastructure (AMI) in Italy with over 27 million connected electricity meters. Based on the experiences with this installation, Echelon developed the NES (Networked Energy Services) System (including smart meters, data concentrators and a head-end data collection system) in October 2014 with about 3.5 million devices installed.

In August 2014, after quarterly revenues dropped from $24.8 million to $15 million, Echelon announced it was leaving the smart-grid business, shifting its entire corporate focus to the Internet of things as a market for its technology. Echelon committed to only support existing customers, but not grow the grid business, and to potentially seek the sale of its grid business.

Echelon is based in Santa Clara, California, with international offices in China, France, Germany, Italy, Hong Kong, Japan, Korea, The Netherlands, and the United Kingdom.

On June 29, 2018, Adesto Technologies announced its intention to acquire Echelon for $45 million. The acquisition was completed on September 14, 2018.
