= Demand controlled ventilation =

Feedback control method to maintain indoor air quality

Demand controlled ventilation (DCV) is a feedback control method to maintain indoor air quality that automatically adjusts the ventilation rate provided to a space in response to changes in conditions such as occupant number or indoor pollutant concentration. The most common indoor pollutants monitored in DCV systems are carbon dioxide and humidity. This control strategy is mainly intended to reduce the energy used by heating, ventilation, and air conditioning (HVAC) systems compared to those of buildings that use open-loop controls with constant ventilation rates. Local sensors and monitoring systems are making a cautious start with filling the void in the human sensory system to assess the ventilation performance. Where the occupants do not have the ability to correctly assess the ventilation performance and related IAQ-levels, local sensors and monitoring systems can. Local ventilation control refers to the ability of ventilation systems to adjust the ventilation rates in each individual room or space separately (opposite to central ventilation rate control). This combined approach of local sensors, local ventilation control and monitoring, can ultimately have a huge impact on both the energy- and ventilation performance and as such may elegantly solve the conflicting requirements concerning energy consumption (aiming at lowering the ventilation rates) and indoor air quality (preferring higher ventilation rates). Local sensors that detect presence and number of people in a confined space, as well as local sensors that detect actual pollutants concentrations can be used to determine the required ventilation rates in order to minimise exposure. During absence and low pollutant concentration levels, the minimum required ventilations rates can be applied in order to minimise energy consumption for ventilation.

== Energy efficiency and IAQ ==
From an energetic viewpoint in a residential market, demand controlled ventilation systems are a good alternative for the heat recovery ventilation. Dwellings with demand controlled ventilation showed no significant better or worse indoor air quality than dwellings with mechanical ventilation with heat recovery. The total cost or net present value of qualitative DCMEV systems with or without demand control is nearly a third lower than that of a qualitative MVHR system, due to higher investment and maintenance cost of this latter.

== Sensors and control ==
IAQ sensors are defined as sensing devices that can measure certain pollutant concentrations in the air. Three types of IAQ-sensors are predominantly used in the residential ventilation sector:

1. CO2 sensors

2. RH-sensors

3. TVOC sensors

According to Regulation (EU) 1253/2014, the definitions for local and central demand control are as follows (Annex I, part 1):

- 'central demand control' means a demand control of a ducted ventilation unit that continuously regulates the fan speed(s) and flow rate based on one sensor for the whole ventilated building or part of the building at central level.
- 'local demand control' means a demand control for a ventilation unit that continuously regulates the fan speed(s) and flow rates based on more than one sensor for a ducted ventilation unit or one sensor for a non-ducted unit.

== Codes & standards ==
Common reference codes and standards for ventilation:

- EN 16798-1 : Energy performance of buildings - Ventilation for buildings - Part 1: Indoor environmental input parameters for design and assessment of energy performance of buildings addressing indoor air quality, thermal environment, lighting and acoustics
- International Organization for Standardization (ISO) International Classification for Standards (ICS) 91.140.30: Ventilation and air-conditioning systems
- American Society of Heating, Refrigerating, and Air-Conditioning Engineers (ASHRAE) 62.1 & 62.2: The standards for Ventilation and Indoor Air Quality
