= Variable air volume =

Heating or air-conditioning system

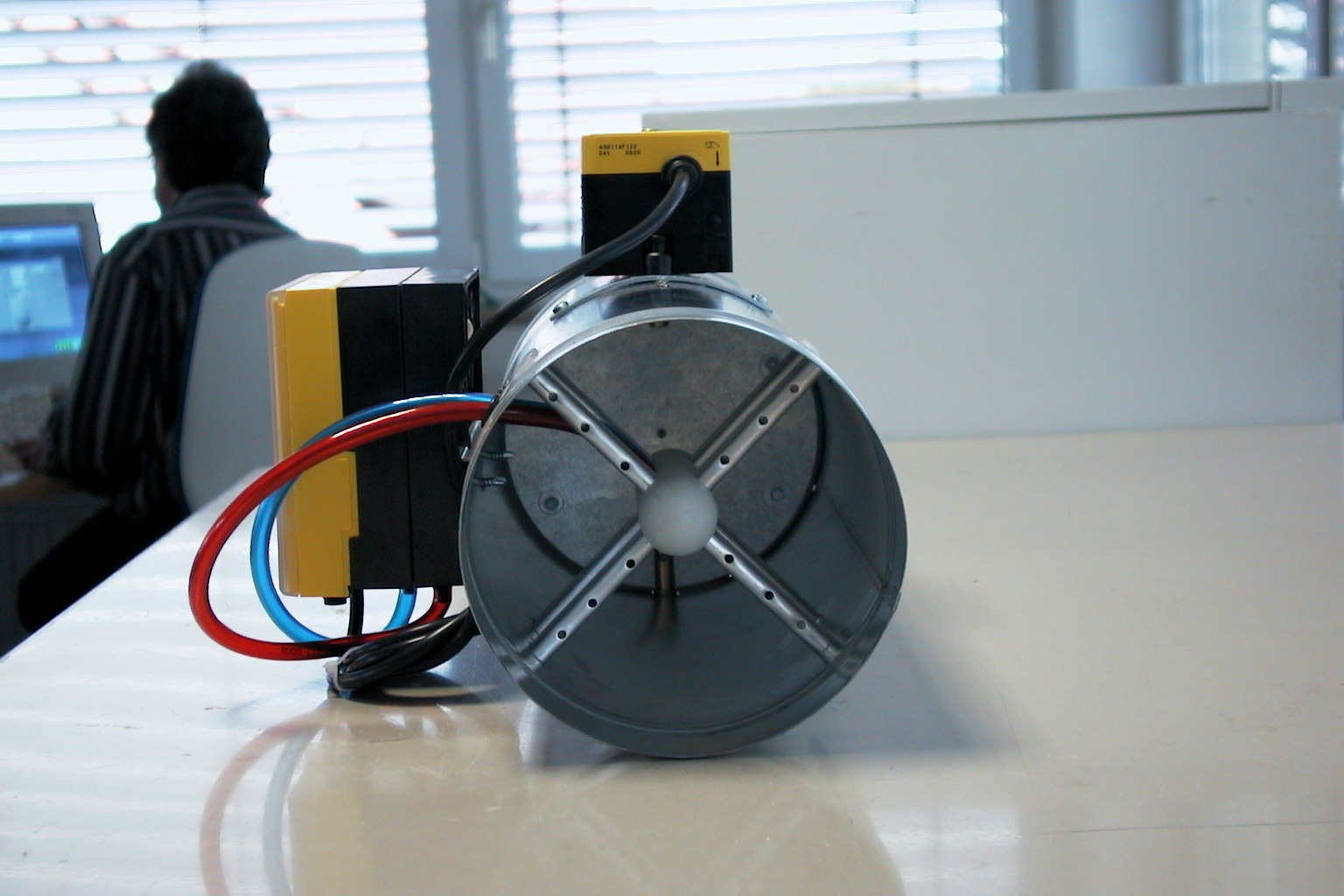
Air volume regulator

Variable air volume (VAV) is a type of heating, ventilating, and/or air-conditioning (HVAC) system. Unlike constant air volume (CAV) systems, which supply a constant airflow at a variable temperature, VAV systems vary the airflow at a constant or varying temperature. The advantages of VAV systems over constant-volume systems include more precise temperature control, reduced compressor wear, lower energy consumption by system fans, less fan noise, and additional passive dehumidification.

== Box technology ==
A VAV box is the unit that controls the flow of air. The single duct terminal configuration is the simplest, where a VAV box is connected to a single supply air duct that delivers treated air from an air-handling unit (AHU) to the space the box is serving. This configuration can deliver air at variable temperatures or air volumes to meet the heating and cooling loads as well as the ventilation rates required by the space.

Most commonly, VAV boxes are pressure independent, meaning the VAV box uses controls to deliver a constant flow rate regardless of variations in system pressures experienced at the VAV inlet. This is accomplished by an airflow sensor that is placed at the VAV inlet which opens or closes the damper within the VAV box to adjust the airflow. The difference between a CAV and VAV box is that a VAV box can be programmed to modulate between different flowrate setpoints depending on the conditions of the space. The VAV box is programmed to operate between a minimum and maximum airflow setpoint and can modulate the flow of air depending on occupancy, temperature, or other control parameters. A CAV box can only operate between a constant, maximum value, or an “off” state. This difference means the VAV box can provide tighter space temperature control while using much less energy. Another reason why VAV boxes save more energy is that they are coupled with variable-speed drives on fans, so the fans can ramp down when the VAV boxes are experiencing part load conditions.

It is common for VAV boxes to include a form of reheat, either electric or hydronic heating coils. While electric coils operate on the principle of electric resistance heating, whereby electrical energy is converted to heat via electric resistance, hydronic heating uses hot water to transfer heat from the coil to the air. The addition of reheat coils allows the box to adjust the supply air temperature to meet the heating loads in the space while delivering the required ventilation rates. In some applications it is possible for the space to require such high air-change rates it causes a risk of over-cooling. In this scenario, the reheat coils could increase the air temperature to maintain the temperature setpoint in the space. This scenario tends to happen during cooling seasons in buildings which have perimeter and interior zones. The perimeter zones, with more sun exposure, require a lower supply air temperature from the air-handling unit than the interior zones, which have less sun exposure and tend to stay cooler than the perimeter zones when left un-conditioned. With the same supply air temperature being delivered to both zones, the reheat coils must heat the air for the interior zone to avoid over-cooling.

== Multiple-zone systems ==
The air blower's flow rate is variable. For a single VAV air handler that serves multiple thermal zones, the flow rate to each zone must be varied as well.

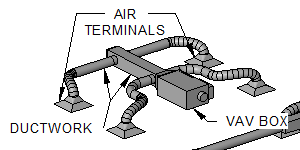
Simple VAV terminal unit

A VAV terminal unit, often called a VAV box, is the zone-level flow control device. It is basically a calibrated air damper with an automatic actuator. The VAV terminal unit is connected to either a local or a central control system. Historically, pneumatic control was commonplace, but electronic direct digital control systems are popular especially for mid- to large-size applications. Hybrid control, for example having pneumatic actuators with digital data collection, is popular as well.

A common commercial application is shown in the diagram. This VAV system consists of a VAV box, ductwork, and four air terminals.

== Fan control for a pressure-independent system ==
Control of the system's fan capacity is critical in VAV systems. Without proper and rapid flow rate control, the system's ductwork, or its sealing, can easily be damaged by overpressurization. In the cooling mode of operation, as the temperature in the space is satisfied, a VAV box closes to limit the flow of cool air into the space. As the temperature increases in the space, the box opens to bring the temperature back down. The fan maintains a constant static pressure in the discharge duct regardless of the position of the VAV box. Therefore, as the box closes, the fan slows down or restricts the amount of air going into the supply duct. As the box opens, the fan speeds up and allows more air flow into the duct, maintaining a constant static pressure.

One of the challenges for VAV systems is providing adequate temperature control for multiple zones with different environmental conditions, such as an office on the glass perimeter of a building vs. an interior office down the hall. Dual duct systems provide cool air in one duct and warm air in a second duct to provide an appropriate temperature of mixed supply air for any zone. An extra duct, however, is cumbersome and expensive. Reheating the air from a single duct, using electric or hot water heating, is often a more cost-effective solution.

== Reheat applications - Controls and energy issues ==
Traditional VAV reheat systems use minimum airflow rates of 30% to 50% the design airflow. These airflow minimums are selected to avoid the risk of under-ventilation and thermal comfort issues. However, published research supporting the efficacy of this approach is scarce. Systems operating at lower minimum airflow ranges (10% to 20% of design airflow) stand to use less fan and reheat coil energy relative to a traditional system, and recent research has shown that thermal comfort and adequate ventilation can still be attained at these lower minimums.

VAV reheat systems using the higher minimum airflow typically employ a conventional "single maximum" control sequence. Under this control sequence, a single cooling maximum airflow setpoint is selected for design cooling conditions. The cooling airflow is gradually lowered to the minimum airflow setpoint, where it remains as the space temperature lowers beyond the cooling temperature setpoint. When the heating setpoint is reached, the electric or hydronic heating coil is activated and gradually provides more heat until the maximum heating capacity is reached at the design heating temperature.

Research has shown that using a different, "dual maximum" control sequence can save substantial amounts of energy relative to the conventional "single maximum" control sequence. This is accomplished due to the "dual maximum" sequence’s use of lower minimum airflow rates. Under this control sequence, the same cooling maximum airflow is selected and is similarly lowered as the space temperature decreases. By the time the space temperature drops to the cooling temperature setpoint, the airflow reaches a lower minimum value than that used in the "single maximum" sequence (10% - 20% vs. 30% - 50% of maximum cooling airflow). When the space temperature reaches the heating temperature setpoint, the heating coil is activated and increases its electrical power (for electric coils) or hot water valve position (for hydronic coils) while the airflow remains at the minimum setpoint. When the heating coil reaches its maximum heating capacity, upon a further drop in space temperature, the airflow is increased until it reaches a maximum heating airflow setpoint (typically about 50% of the maximum cooling airflow).
