= Crossbar, Inc. =

- Type: Privately held
- Industry: Semiconductors: memory
- Founded: 2010
- Founder: George Minassian, Hagop Nazarian, Wei Lu
- Headquarters: Santa Clara, California
- Products: Semiconductor Memory Technology
- Number of employees: 20+
- Website: crossbar-inc.com

Crossbar is a company based in Santa Clara, California. Crossbar develops a class of non-volatile resistive random-access memory (ReRAM) technology.

== History ==
Crossbar was founded in 2010, by George Minassian, Hagop Nazarian, and Wei Lu. The company, spun out of the University of Michigan electrical engineering and computer science research lab, licensed resistive RAM (RRAM) patents from the University of Michigan. Crossbar filed patents relating to the development, commercialization and manufacturing of RRAM technology.

In August 2013, Crossbar emerged from stealth mode and announced the development of a memory array at a commercial semiconductor device fabrication facility. It was said to deliver faster write performance; lower power consumption and more endurance at half the die size, compared to NAND flash memory. Since it is CMOS-compatible, it can be fabricated without special equipment or materials.

Crossbar received $25 million in funding from Artiman Ventures, Kleiner Perkins Caufield and Byers, Northern Light Venture Capital and the Michigan Investment in New Technology Startups (MINTS) program in 2012. Another funding round of about $35 million was announced in September 2015, with investors from China and Hong Kong.

Crossbar primarily markets to original equipment manufacturers (OEMs) and system on a chip (SOC) developers of consumer, enterprise, mobile, industrial and Internet of things products.

== Products ==
The company in 2013 announced its goal was a terabyte of storage on a single RRAM integrated circuit, compatible with standard CMOS semiconductor manufacturing processes, with a prototype showcased the same year having the theoretical ability to achieve this on a 200mm^{2} chip. According to Crossbar, the chip uses a crosspoint array to stack multiple silver-ion-based memory layers on top of each other, with the prototype having three such layers.

== See also ==
- 3D XPoint
