= Testing, adjusting, balancing =

Three steps for heating maintenance

In heating, ventilation, and air conditioning (HVAC), testing, adjusting and balancing (TAB) are the three major steps used to achieve proper operation of heating, ventilation, and air conditioning systems. TAB usually refers to commercial building construction and the specialized contractors who employ personnel that perform this service.

In general, the TAB specialist performs air and hydronic measurements on the HVAC systems and adjusts the flows as required to achieve optimum performance of the building environmental equipment. The balancing is usually based upon the design flow values required by the Mechanical Engineer for the project, and the TAB contractor submits a written report which summarizes the testing and balancing and notes any deficiencies found during the TAB work. Many times facility managers will use a TAB contractor to assist in identifying preexisting or common issues with a facility. While not necessary to be a TAB contractor, many contractors tend to hold professional air balancing certifications.

== Testing ==
Testing is the use of specialized and calibrated instruments to measure temperatures, pressures, rotational speeds, electrical characteristics, velocities, and air and water quantities for an evaluation of equipment and system performance.

== Adjusting ==
Adjusting is the final setting of balancing devices such as dampers and valves, adjusting fan speeds and pump impeller sizes, in addition to automatic control devices such as thermostats and pressure controllers to achieve maximum specified system performance and efficiency during normal operation.

== Balancing ==
Balancing is the methodical regulation of system fluid flows (air or water) through the use of acceptable procedures to achieve the desired or specified design airflow or water flow. When beginning the balance of a system, you must locate the terminal with the least amount of flow in regards to the engineer's drawing. Once the "low" terminal has been located, you can then proceed to adjust all other diffusers/grilles (air) or circuit balancing valves (water) to proportionally match the original "low" terminal. There must be at least one terminal that is wide open to achieve optimum efficiency.
