= Adesto Technologies =

Semiconductor manufacturer from the USA

Adesto Technologies Corporation
- Logo as of 2014

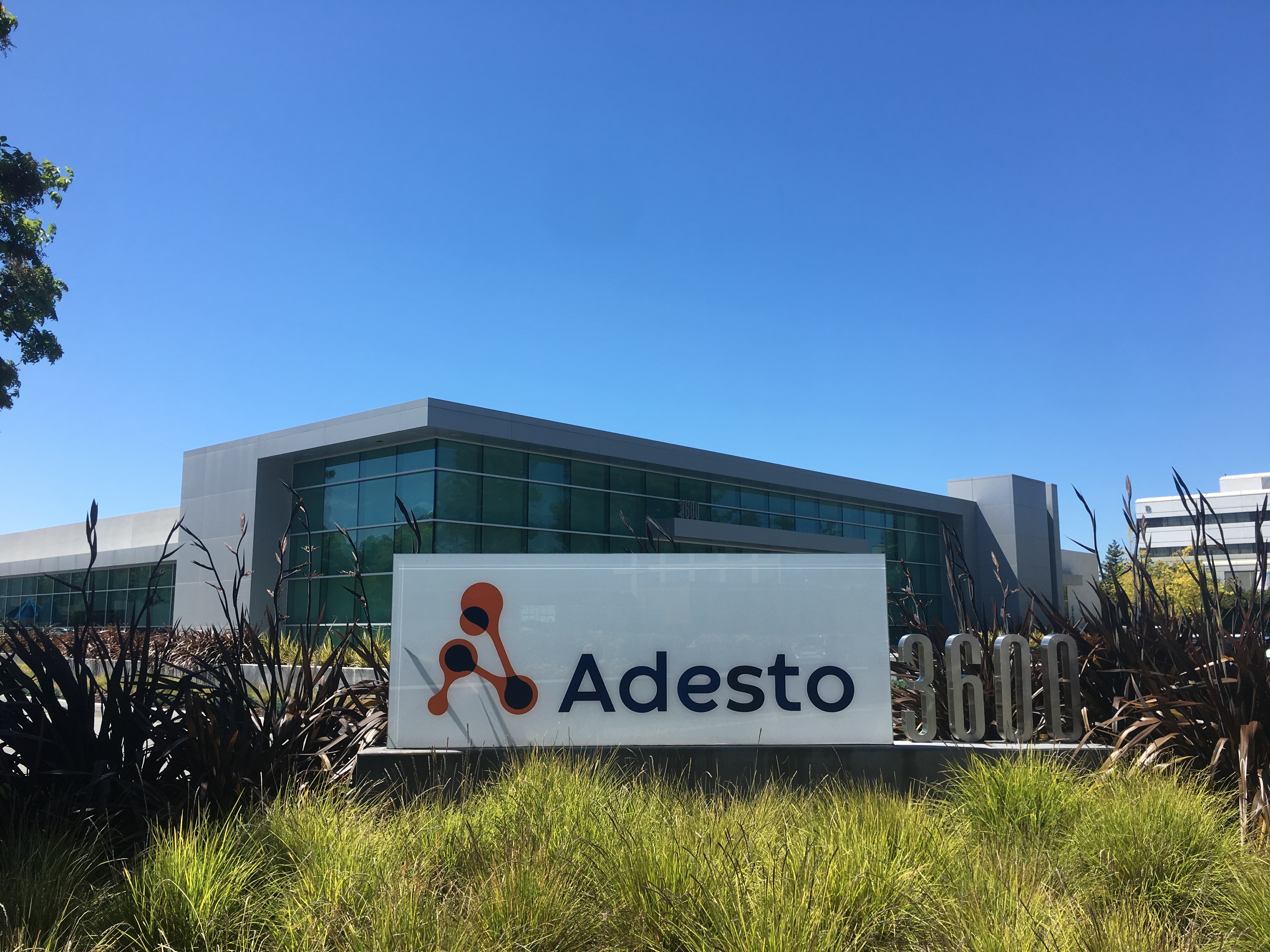
- Exterior of Adesto Technologies headquarters
- Company type: Public
- Traded as: Nasdaq: IOTS
- Industry: Semiconductors; Embedded systems
- Founded: 2006; 20 years ago
- Headquarters: Santa Clara, California, U.S.
- Area served: Worldwide
- Key people: Narbeh Derhacobian (president & CEO); Ron Shelton (CFO)
- Products: Non-volatile memory; Custom ASICs; IP Cores; Embedded systems
- Revenue: ▲US$ 83.49 million (2018)
- Operating income: ▼US$ -11.26 million (2018)
- Net income: ▼US$ -21.44 million (2018)
- Total assets: ▲US$ 137.19 million (2018)
- Total equity: ▲US$ 62.74 million (2018)
- Number of employees: 265
- Parent: Dialog Semiconductor
- Website: adestotech.com at the Wayback Machine (archived 2019-03-14)

Adesto Technologies Corporation was an American corporation founded in 2006 and based in Santa Clara, California. The company provided application-specific integrated circuits (ASICs) and embedded systems for the Internet of Things (IoT), and sells its products directly to original equipment manufacturers (OEMs) and original design manufacturers (ODMs) that manufacture products for its end customers. In 2020, Adesto was bought by Dialog Semiconductor.

== History ==
Adesto Technologies was founded by Narbeh Derhacobian, Shane Hollmer, and Ishai Naveh in 2006. Derhacobian formerly served in senior technical and managerial roles at AMD, Virage Logic, and Cswitch Corporations. The company developed a non-volatile memory based on the movement of copper ions in a programmable metallization cell technology licensed from Axon Technologies Corp., a spinoff of Arizona State University.

In October 2010, Adesto acquired intellectual property and patents related to Conductive Bridging Random Access Memory (CBRAM) technology from Qimonda AG, and its first CBRAM product began production in 2011.

In 2015, the company held an initial public offering under the symbol IOTS, which entered the market at $5 per share. Underwriters included Needham & Company, Oppenheimer & Co. Inc., and Roth Capital Partners. The entire offering was valued at $28.75 million.

Between May and September 2018, Adesto completed two acquisitions of S3 Semiconductors and Echelon Corporation. In May, the company acquired S3 Semiconductors, a provider of analog and mixed-signal ASICs and Intellectual Property (IP) cores. In June, the company announced its intention to buy Echelon Corporation, a home and industrial automation company, for $45 million. The acquisition was completed three months later. The company's offerings were expanded to include ASICs and IP from S3 Semiconductors and embedded systems from Echelon Corporation, in addition to its original non-volatile memory (NVM) products.

In 2018 Adesto started a cooperation with the University of California San Diego in order to explore the possibility for calculations to be made directly in the memory.

In 2020, Adesto was acquired by Dialog Semiconductor, a company headquartered in Reading, United Kingdom, for $500 million.
