= Building automation =

Branch of automation

Building automation systems (BAS), also known as building management system (BMS) or building energy management system (BEMS), is the automatic centralized control of a building's HVAC (heating, ventilation and air conditioning), electrical, lighting, shading, access control, security systems, and other interrelated systems. Some objectives of building automation are improved occupant comfort, efficient operation of building systems, reduction in energy consumption, reduced operating and maintaining costs and increased security.

BAS functionality may keep a building's climate within a specified range, provide light to rooms based on occupancy, monitor performance and device failures, and provide malfunction alarms to building maintenance staff. A BAS works to reduce building energy and maintenance costs compared to a non-controlled building. Most commercial, institutional, and industrial buildings built after 2000 include a BAS, whilst older buildings may be retrofitted with a new BAS.

A building controlled by a BAS is often referred to as an "intelligent building", a "smart building", or (if a residence) a smart home. Commercial and industrial buildings have historically relied on robust proven protocols (like BACnet) while proprietary protocols (like X-10) were used in homes.

With the advent of wireless sensor networks and the Internet of Things, an increasing number of smart buildings are resorting to using low-power wireless communication technologies such as Zigbee, Bluetooth Low Energy and LoRa to interconnect the local sensors, actuators and processing devices.

Almost all multi-story green buildings are designed to accommodate a BAS for the energy, air and water conservation characteristics. Electrical device demand response is a typical function of a BAS, as is the more sophisticated ventilation and humidity monitoring required of "tight" insulated buildings. Most green buildings also use as many low-power DC devices as possible. Even a passivhaus design intended to consume no net energy whatsoever will typically require a BAS to manage heat capture, shading and venting, and scheduling device use.

== Characteristics ==
Building management systems are most commonly implemented in large projects with extensive mechanical, HVAC, and electrical systems. Systems linked to a BMS typically represent 40% of a building's energy usage; if lighting is included, this number approaches to 70%. BMS systems are a critical component to managing energy demand. Improperly configured BMS systems are believed to account for 20% of building energy usage, or approximately 8% of total energy usage in the United States.

In addition to controlling the building's internal environment, BMS systems are sometimes linked to access control (turnstiles and access doors controlling who is allowed access and egress to the building) or other security systems such as closed-circuit television (CCTV) and motion detectors. Fire alarm systems and elevators are also sometimes linked to a BMS for monitoring. In case a fire is detected then only the fire alarm panel could close dampers in the ventilation system to stop smoke spreading, shut down air handlers, start smoke evacuation fans, and send all the elevators to the ground floor and park them to prevent people from using them.

Building management systems have also included disaster-response mechanisms (such as base isolation) to save structures from earthquakes. In more recent times, companies and governments have been working to find similar solutions for flood zones and coastal areas at-risk to rising sea levels. Self-adjusting floating environment draws from existing technologies used to float concrete bridges and runways such as Washington's SR 520 and Japan's Mega-Float.

== Types of inputs and outputs ==
=== Sensors ===
Analog inputs are used to read a variable measurement. Examples are temperature, humidity and pressure sensors which could be thermistor, 4–20 mA, 0–10 volt or platinum resistance thermometer (resistance temperature detector), or wireless sensors.

A digital input indicates a device is on or off. Some examples of digital inputs would be a door contact switch, a current switch, an air flow switch, or a voltage-free relay contact (dry contact). Digital inputs could also be pulse inputs counting the pulses over a period of time. An example is a turbine flow meter transmitting flow data as a frequency of pulses to an input.

Nonintrusive load monitoring is software relying on digital sensors and algorithms to discover appliance or other loads from electrical or magnetic characteristics of the circuit. It is however detecting the event by an analog means. These are extremely cost-effective in operation and useful not only for identification but to detect start-up transients, line or equipment faults, etc.

Occupancy sensors detect the presence, number, and sometimes location of people in a space to enable demand-controlled systems for lighting, HVAC, and energy management. Traditional examples include passive infrared (PIR), ultrasonic, and CO_{2}-based detectors, but advanced systems use low-resolution thermal imaging or area sensors to provide zone-level accuracy without capturing identifiable images, ensuring privacy compliance (e.g., GDPR). These sensors output analog heat signatures or digital counts that integrate with building management systems via protocols like BACnet or wireless IoT networks, reducing energy use by up to 40% through precise ventilation and lighting control.

=== Controls ===
Analog outputs control the speed or position of a device, such as a variable frequency drive, an I-P (current to pneumatics) transducer, or a valve or damper actuator. An example is a hot water valve opening up 25% to maintain a setpoint. Another example is a variable frequency drive ramping up a motor slowly to avoid a hard start.

Digital outputs are used to open and close relays and switches as well as drive a load upon command. An example would be to turn on the parking lot lights when a photocell indicates it is dark outside. Another example would be to open a valve by allowing 24VDC/AC to pass through the output powering the valve. Analog outputs could also be pulse type outputs emitting a frequency of pulses over a given period of time. An example is an energy meter calculating kWh and emitting a frequency of pulses accordingly.

== Infrastructure ==
An example layout of a building automation system

=== Controller ===
Controllers are essentially small, purpose-built computers with input and output capabilities. These controllers come in a range of sizes and capabilities to control devices commonly found in buildings, and to control sub-networks of controllers.

Inputs allow a controller to read temperature, humidity, pressure, current flow, air flow, and other essential factors. The outputs allow the controller to send command and control signals to slave devices, and to other parts of the system. Inputs and outputs can be either digital or analog. Digital outputs are also sometimes called discrete depending on manufacturer.

Controllers used for building automation can be grouped in three categories: programmable logic controllers (PLCs), system/network controllers, and terminal unit controllers. However an additional device can also exist in order to integrate third-party systems (e.g. a stand-alone AC system) into a central building automation system.

Terminal unit controllers usually are suited for control of lighting and/or simpler devices such as a package rooftop unit, heat pump, VAV box, fan coil, etc. The installer typically selects one of the available pre-programmed personalities best suited to the device to be controlled, and does not have to create new control logic.

=== Occupancy ===
Occupancy is one of two or more operating modes for a building automation system; unoccupied, morning warmup, and night-time setback are other common modes.

Occupancy is usually based on time of day schedules. In occupancy mode, the BAS aims to provides a comfortable climate and adequate lighting, often with zone-based control so that users on one side of a building have a different thermostat (or a different system, or sub system) than users on the opposite side.

A temperature sensor in the zone provides feedback to the controller, so it can deliver heating or cooling as needed.

If enabled, morning warmup (MWU) mode occurs prior to occupancy. During morning warmup the BAS tries to bring the building to setpoint just in time for occupancy. The BAS often factors in outdoor conditions and historical experience to optimize MWU. This is also referred to as optimized start.

Some buildings rely on occupancy sensors to activate lighting or climate conditioning. Given the potential for long lead times before a space becomes sufficiently cool or warm, climate conditioning is not often initiated directly by an occupancy sensor.

=== Lighting ===
Lighting can be turned on, off, or dimmed with a building automation or lighting control system based on time of day, or on occupancy sensor, photosensors and timers. One typical example is to turn the lights in a space on for a half-hour since the last motion was sensed. A photocell placed outside a building can sense darkness, and the time of day, and modulate lights in outer offices and the parking lot.

Lighting is also a good candidate for demand response, with many control systems providing the ability to dim (or turn off) lights to take advantage of DR incentives and savings.

In newer buildings, the lighting control can be based on the field bus Digital Addressable Lighting Interface (DALI). Lamps with DALI ballasts are fully dimmable. DALI can also detect lamp and ballast failures on DALI luminaires and signals failures.

=== Shading and glazing ===
Shading and glazing are essential components in the building system, they affect occupants' visual, acoustical, and thermal comfort and provide the occupant with a view outdoor. Automated shading and glazing systems are solutions for controlling solar heat gains and glare. It refers to the use of technology to control external or internal shading devices (such as blinds, and shades) or glazing itself. The system has an active and rapid response to various changing outdoor data (such as solar, wind) and to changing interior environment (such as temperature, illuminance, and occupant demands). Building shading and glazing systems can contribute to thermal and lighting improvement from both energy conservation and comfort point of view.

==== Dynamic shading ====
Dynamic shading devices allow the control of daylight and solar energy to enter into built environment in relation to outdoor conditions, daylighting demands and solar positions. The common products include venetian blinds, roller shades, louvers, and shutters. They are mostly installed on the interior side of the glazing system because of the low maintenance cost, but also can be used on the exterior or a combination of both.

=== Air handlers ===
Most air handlers mix return and outside air so less temperature/humidity conditioning is needed. This can save money by using less chilled or heated water (not all AHUs use chilled or hot water circuits). Some external air is needed to keep the building's air healthy. To optimize energy efficiency while maintaining healthy indoor air quality (IAQ), demand control (or controlled) ventilation (DCV) adjusts the amount of outside air based on measured levels of occupancy.

Analog or digital temperature sensors may be placed in the space or room, the return and supply air ducts, and sometimes the external air. Actuators are placed on the hot and chilled water valves, the outside air and return air dampers. The supply fan (and return if applicable) is started and stopped based on either time of day, temperatures, building pressures or a combination.

=== Alarms and security ===
All modern building automation systems have alarm capabilities. It does little good to detect a potentially hazardous or costly situation if no one who can solve the problem is notified. Notification can be through a computer (email or text message), pager, cellular phone voice call, audible alarm, or all of these. For insurance and liability purposes all systems keep logs of who was notified, when and how.

Alarms may immediately notify someone or only notify when alarms build to some threshold of seriousness or urgency. At sites with several buildings, momentary power failures can cause hundreds or thousands of alarms from equipment that has shut down – these should be suppressed and recognized as symptoms of a larger failure. Some sites are programmed so that critical alarms are automatically re-sent at varying intervals. For example, a repeating critical alarm (of an uninterruptible power supply in 'bypass') might resound at 10 minutes, 30 minutes, and every 2 to 4 hours thereafter until the alarms are resolved.

Security systems can be interlocked to a building automation system. If occupancy sensors are present, they can also be used as burglar alarms. Because security systems are often deliberately sabotaged, at least some detectors or cameras should have battery backup and wireless connectivity and the ability to trigger alarms when disconnected. Modern systems typically use power-over-Ethernet (which can operate a pan-tilt-zoom camera and other devices up to 30–90 watts) which is capable of charging such batteries and keeps wireless networks free for genuinely wireless applications, such as backup communication in outage.

Fire alarm panels and their related smoke alarm systems are usually hard-wired to override building automation. For example: if the smoke alarm is activated, all the outside air dampers close to prevent air coming into the building, and an exhaust system can isolate the blaze. Similarly, electrical fault detection systems can turn entire circuits off, regardless of the number of alarms this triggers or persons this distresses. Fossil fuel combustion devices also tend to have their own over-rides, such as natural gas feed lines that turn off when slow pressure drops are detected (indicating a leak), or when excess methane is detected in the building's air supply.

== Buses and protocols ==
Most building automation networks consist of a primary and secondary bus which connect high-level controllers (generally specialized for building automation, but may be generic programmable logic controllers) with lower-level controllers, input/output devices and a user interface (also known as a human interface device). ASHRAE's open protocol BACnet or the open protocol LonTalk specify how most such devices interoperate. Modern systems use SNMP to track events, building on decades of history with SNMP-based protocols in the computer networking world.

Physical connectivity between devices was historically provided by dedicated optical fiber, ethernet, ARCNET, RS-232, RS-485 or a low-bandwidth special purpose wireless network. Modern systems rely on standards-based multi-protocol heterogeneous networking such as that specified in the IEEE 1905.1 standard and verified by the nVoy auditing mark. These accommodate typically only IP-based networking but can make use of any existing wiring, and also integrate powerline networking over AC circuits, power over Ethernet low-power DC circuits, high-bandwidth wireless networks such as LTE and IEEE 802.11n and IEEE 802.11ac and often integrate these using the building-specific wireless mesh open standard Zigbee.

Proprietary hardware dominates the controller market. Each company has controllers for specific applications. Some are designed with limited controls and no interoperability, such as simple packaged roof top units for HVAC. Software will typically not integrate well with packages from other vendors. Cooperation is at the Zigbee/BACnet/LonTalk level only.

Current systems provide interoperability at the application level, allowing users to mix-and-match devices from different manufacturers, and to provide integration with other compatible building control systems. These typically rely on SNMP, long used for this same purpose to integrate diverse computer networking devices into one coherent network.

=== Protocols and industry standards ===
- 1-Wire
- BACnet
- Bluetooth
- DALI
- Dynet
- EnOcean
- KNX
- LonTalk
- OPC
- OpenTherm
- OpenWebNet
- VSCP
- Z-Wave
- Zigbee

== Security concerns ==
With the growing spectrum of capabilities and connections to the Internet of Things, building automation systems were repeatedly reported to be vulnerable, allowing hackers and cybercriminals to attack their components. Buildings can be exploited by hackers to measure or change their environment: sensors allow surveillance (e.g. monitoring movements of employees or habits of inhabitants) while actuators allow to perform actions in buildings (e.g. opening doors or windows for intruders). Several vendors and committees started to improve the security features in their products and standards, including KNX, Zigbee and BACnet (see recent standards or standard drafts). However, researchers report several open problems in building automation security.

On November 11, 2019, a 132-page security research paper was released titled "I Own Your Building (Management System)" by Gjoko Krstic and Sipke Mellema that addressed more than 100 vulnerabilities affecting various BMS and access control solutions by various vendors.

On November 24, 2025, a 161-page security research paper was released titled "Project Brainfog: Beyond the Facade - Exposing Smart Giants" by Gjoko Krstic that addressed more than 1000 vulnerabilities affecting two widely used BAS controllers by ABB Group.

== Room automation ==
Room automation is a subset of building automation and with a similar purpose; it is the consolidation of one or more systems under centralized control, though in this case in one room.

The most common example of room automation is corporate boardroom, presentation suites, and lecture halls, where the operation of the large number of devices that define the room function (such as videoconferencing equipment, video projectors, lighting control systems, public address systems etc.) would make manual operation of the room very complex. It is common for room automation systems to employ a touchscreen as the primary way of controlling each operation.

On November 27, 2018, a 29-page research paper titled "A Scalable Room Occupancy Prediction with Transferable Time Series Decomposition of CO_{2} Sensor Data" was published by Irvan Bastian Arief, Margaret Hamilton, and Flora Salim. The paper introduced a novel approach to leveraging carbon dioxide (CO_{2}) sensor data to predict room occupancy—enabling smarter building automation by estimating the number of occupants in a room at any given time.

== See also ==
- Building information modeling (BIM)
- Control engineering
- Digital home
- Index of home automation articles
- Smart environment
- Testing, adjusting, balancing
