= Novar =

Novar may refer to:

== Companies ==
- Novar plc – the international conglomerate based in the United Kingdom that was acquired in 2005 by Honeywell
- Novar Controls – a subsidiary of Honeywell, and former subsidiary of Novar plc

== Places ==
- Novar House, Highland, Scotland
- Novar airfield, later HMS Fieldfare
- Novar Gardens, South Australia, suburb of Adelaide
- Novo Brdo known as Novar in Ottoman Turkish
