= List of Honeywell products and services =

Honeywell offers a number of products and services across its four business groups: Aerospace, Home and Building Technologies (HBT), Safety and Productivity Solutions (SPS), and Performance Materials and Technologies (PMT). This is a partial list of products manufactured and services offered by Honeywell.

== Aerospace ==
Aerospace produces integrated avionics systems, engines, navigation & radios, flight management services, and cockpit displays.

- Actuation Systems
- Aspire 200 Satellite Communications System
- Automatic Identification System (AIS) / RF Receivers
- Auxiliary Power Units (APUs)
- BendixKing
- Garrett TPE331
- GoDirect Services
- GPS and Global Navigation System Sensor Units
- HG1120 IMU
- Honeywell RQ-16 T-Hawk
- Honeywell HTF7000
- Honeywell HTS900
- Primus Epic Radio System
- Primus II Radio System
- Radio Management Unit (RMU)
- RUR-5 ASROC
- SmartRunway and SmartLanding
- Turbochargers
- Turbocharged petrol engines
- Variable-geometry turbochargers
- Wagtail (missile)- Discontinued early 1960s.

== Home and Building Technologies ==
Home and Building Technologies produces burglar alarms, Inncom hotel management systems, airport solutions and a wide variety of sensors.

- Access Systems
- Air Purifiers
- A-VDGS (Advanced Visual Docking Guidance System)
- Airfield Ground Lighting (AGL)
- Ball Valve & Actuator
- Biometric Readers
- Building Operation Expert (BOE)
- Butterfly Valve & Actuator
- Cable Management
- Circuit Protection
- Comfort Point Open
- Command and Control Suite
- Damper Actuator (or DCA)
- Digital Video Manager
- equIP Camera Series
- Electrical Balancing Valve - Kombi Series
- Electrical Sub-meter
- Emergency Lighting
- Enterprise Buildings Integrator
- ESPCs (energy service performance contracting)
- eVance Facility Manager
- Fire Alarm Aspiration Sensing Technology™ (FAAST™)
- Fire IOT Platform
- Fire Protection Gas Suppression System
- Fire Sprinkler Monitoring
- Gas leak detectors
- Globe Valve & Actuator
- Honeywell Excel Series
- Honeywell's Smart Home Security Starter Kit
- Honeywell Guest Room Control
- Honeywell Public Address and Voice Alarm (PAVA) products
- Honeywell Pulse for Connected Buildings
- Honeywell SymmetrE
- Honeywell Vector Occupant App
- Honeywell WEBs N4 - Niagara
- Honeywell WEBs-EXP (Energy Expert)
- HUS (Honeywell Universal Surveillance)
- HVAC Controls
- Integrated Utility Tunnel Platform (IUT)
- LobbyWorks Visitor Management Suite
- Integrated Utility Tunnel Platform (IUT)
- MAXPRO Cloud Alarm Monitor
- MAXPRO Video Management System
- Mechanical Balancing Valve
- Mechanical Pressure Independent Control Valve
- Network Video Recorders
- Notifications – Horn, Strobe, Speaker
- ONYX® Series Intelligent Fire Systems
- Outcome Based Service
- Performance Lite IP camera series
- Pneumatic Control Valve
- Pro-Watch Security Management System
- Sensors (Temperature, Humidity, T/H, CO, CO_{2}, DPS, Flow)
- Smoke detectors
- Specialty Detection – Flame, Beam, CO, Thermal Sensing Cable
- Standalone Fire Alarm
- Thermostats
  - Honeywell T87, its classic "Round" thermostat
- Variable Air Volume (VAV) Controller, Wall Module and Box
- Variable Frequency Drive (VFD)
- Warehouse Automation
- Water Purifiers
- WIN-PAK software suite
- Wireless intrusion alarm systems - ARMOR 300
- Wiring Device

== Safety and Productivity Solutions ==
Safety and Productivity Solutions produces voice-directed software products and ruggedized handheld computers.

- Automated material handling solutions
- Barcode scanners and readers
- Controls and monitors
- Eye, face and hearing protection
- Fall Protection
- First Aid
- First Responder Gear
- Gas detection systems
- Gas detection
- Hand Protection
- Honeywell AIDC products
- Honeywell Integrated
- Honeywell Voice Maintenance & Inspection
- Howard Leight hearing protection
- Electrical safety products
- Head Protection
- Industrial printers
- Intermec Products
- Lockout-Tagout
- Oliver safety boots
- Print media
- Professional Footwear
- RFID technology
- Respiratory systems
- Industrial handheld computers
- Sensors
- Switches
- Test and measurement products
- Voice-directed software solutions

== Performance Materials and Technologies ==
Performance Materials and Technologies produces Spectra Shield, Solstice refrigerants, and the Honeywell Connected Plant.

- Honeywell Connected Plant
- Spectra Shield
- Solstice
- Experion PKS
