= R. J. Mendenhall =

American businessman and banker (1828–1906)

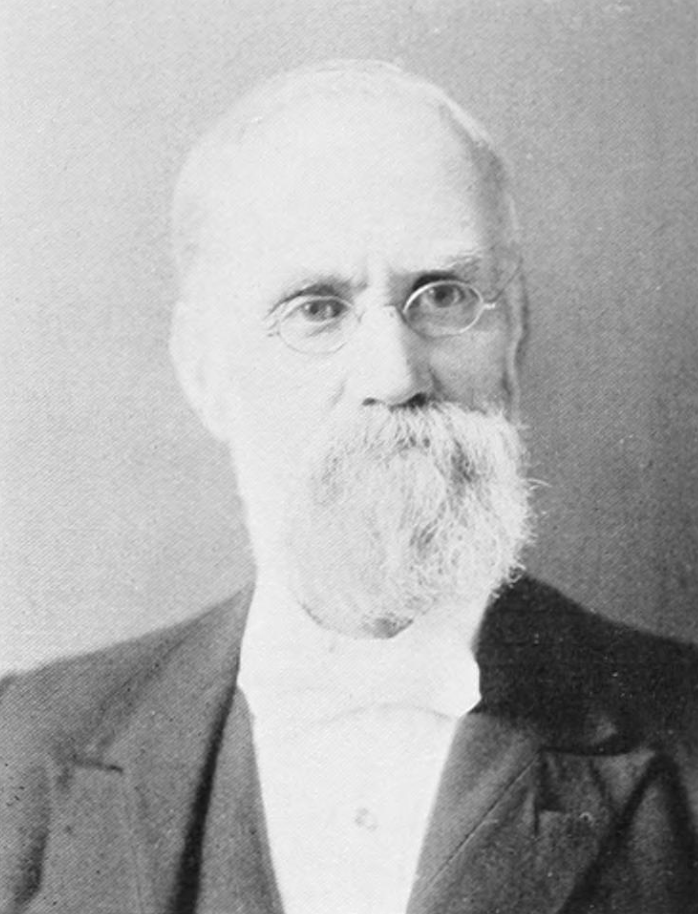
- Born: Richard J. Mendenhall; November 25, 1828; Jamestown, North Carolina
- Died: October 19, 1906 (aged 77); Minneapolis, Minnesota
- Occupation: Businessman
- Spouse: Abby G. Swift (m. 1858; died 1900)

Richard J. Mendenhall (1828–1906) was an American businessman, very active in the Minnesota business world of the late 19th century.

== Early life ==
Mendenhall was born in Jamestown, North Carolina on November 25, 1828. He attended school in New England, Ohio and, in 1853, returned to North Carolina. He subsequently went to New York and, in 1855, moved to Iowa as a civil engineer. In 1856, he moved to Minneapolis, Minnesota.

== Marriage ==
Mr. Mendenhall was married February 11, 1858, to Abby G. Swift, of Massachusetts. They had no children. She died in 1900.

== Later life and career ==
In 1862 he is listed as the President of the State Bank of Minnesota. He participated in Minnesota Floriculture by owning greenhouses. Mendenhall met and provided encouragement to Albert Butz, a Swiss born American inventor and businessman whose early patents led him to found the company which became Honeywell.

Mendenhall died at his home in Minneapolis on October 19, 1906.
