= Delta TechOps =

Delta Air Lines Technical Operations facility in Atlanta, Georgia, United States

- Type: Subsidiary
- Industry: Aviation
- Founded: 1929
- Headquarters: Hartsfield-Jackson Atlanta International Airport
- Key people: Ed Bastian (CEO, Delta Air Lines); John Laughter (SVP, Delta TechOps)
- Products: Maintenance, Repair and Overhaul
- Number of employees: 9,600+
- Parent: Delta Air Lines
- Website: deltatechops.com

Delta TechOps (Technical Operations) is the maintenance, repair and overhaul (MRO) division of Delta Air Lines, headquartered at Hartsfield-Jackson International Airport in Atlanta, Georgia. With more than 9,600 employees and 51 maintenance stations worldwide, Delta TechOps is a full-service maintenance provider for the more than 900 aircraft that make up the Delta Air Lines fleet. In addition to maintaining the Delta Air Lines fleet, Delta TechOps also provides MRO solutions and support to more than 150 third-party operators around the world, making it the second largest MRO provider in North America and the seventh largest worldwide.

Delta Air Lines does not report financial figures for Delta TechOps, although former Delta COO Gil West advised analysts in January 2019 that 2018 revenue figures "pushed well over $700 million, up $100 million year-over-year."

== History ==
The original Delta Technical Operations Center Jet Base, later known as Technical Operations Center (TOC) 1, opened on June 21, 1960 at Atlanta Municipal Airport (eventually renamed to Hartsfield-Jackson Atlanta International Airport). This facility covered nine acres, employed 1,600 individuals and provided service exclusively to Delta Air Lines’ fleet of 79 aircraft, including nine jets. In May 1968, Delta TechOps completed its first expansion, increasing the total space by 7 acres and adding another 1,700 employees, more than doubling the size of the division’s workforce. In 1973, Delta TechOps added another 20-acre hangar, known as TOC 2, increasing the total acreage to 36. By 1982, more additions were needed to accommodate the growing business, and TOC 1 was expanded by another 10 acres.

Up until this point, Delta TechOps had only performed maintenance, repairs and overhauls on Delta Air Lines’ own fleet, but in 1983, the division began offering these services to other airlines. Today, third party business accounts for 20-25% of the division’s workload. The most recent facility expansion, a four-story, 17-acre addition known as TOC 3, was completed in 1991, bringing the total size of the facilities at Hartsfield-Jackson to 63 acres.

On September 14, 2005, parent company Delta Air Lines filed for bankruptcy, citing rising fuel costs. It emerged from bankruptcy in April 2007 after fending off a hostile takeover from US Airways and its shares were re-listed on the New York Stock Exchange.

Delta TechOps generated revenues of more than $310M in 2006 and by 2009, this amount had reached the half-billion mark. In 2008, Delta TechOps received ISO 9001 certifications for its component maintenance shops. In 2009, Delta TechOps joined EPA's National Partnership for Environmental Priorities in committing to eliminate lead from machine shop operations and recycle 7,000 pounds of lead.

In 2011, Delta TechOps expanded its partnership with Skymark Airlines to provide advance exchange power-by-the-hour services for 25 CFM56-7B powered Boeing 737NG aircraft. Delta TechOps received ISO 9001 certification from the International Standards Organization for its engine maintenance and landing gear shops and is one of only a few airline maintenance, repair and overhaul service providers to achieve the certification. Delta TechOps invested in new MRO technology for engines to cut costs and boost revenue during 2012. In 2013, Delta TechOps and EmpowerMX signed an agreement to employ the cloud-based FleetCycle® MRO Manager product as the primary maintenance-execution tool in all of Delta TechOps airframe MRO facilities. In 2014, Delta TechOps expanded its maintenance providership with Hawaiian Airlines with an integrated component exchange and repair program for 12 Boeing 767 aircraft.

== Training and support ==
In addition to MRO services and support, Delta TechOps also provides third-party operators with technical training, engineering support and inventory management. Delta TechOps aviation maintenance technicians (AMT) make up the majority of the company’s instruction and education corps.

== International reach ==
Delta TechOps maintains a quick-response Disabled Aircraft Recovery Team (D.A.R.T.) which provides worldwide aircraft on ground support.

== Specialties ==
Accessories, Actuators, Airframe, APU, Aviation Oxygen, Avionics, C S Ds, Cabin Compressors, Cylinders, Electric Generators, Electric Motors, Engine Accessories (Q E C), Engine Components, Fire Bottles, Fire Extinguishers, Flight Simulator Instruments, Flight Surfaces, Fuel Bladders, Generators, Hydraulics, In Flight Entertainment, Instruments, Landing Gear, Lavatories, Nose Cowls, Other Accessories, Oxygen Cylinders, Oxygen Masks, Passenger Service Units, Pneumatics, Power Plant, Restoration Repair, Starters, Thrust Reversal, Wheels & Brakes

== Aircraft serviced ==
Airbus: A220, A318, A319, A319neo, A320, A320neo A321, A321neo, A330, A330neo, A350XWB

Boeing: 717, 737 (Classic, NG), 747, 757, 767, 777, MD-11, MD-80

== Engines serviced ==
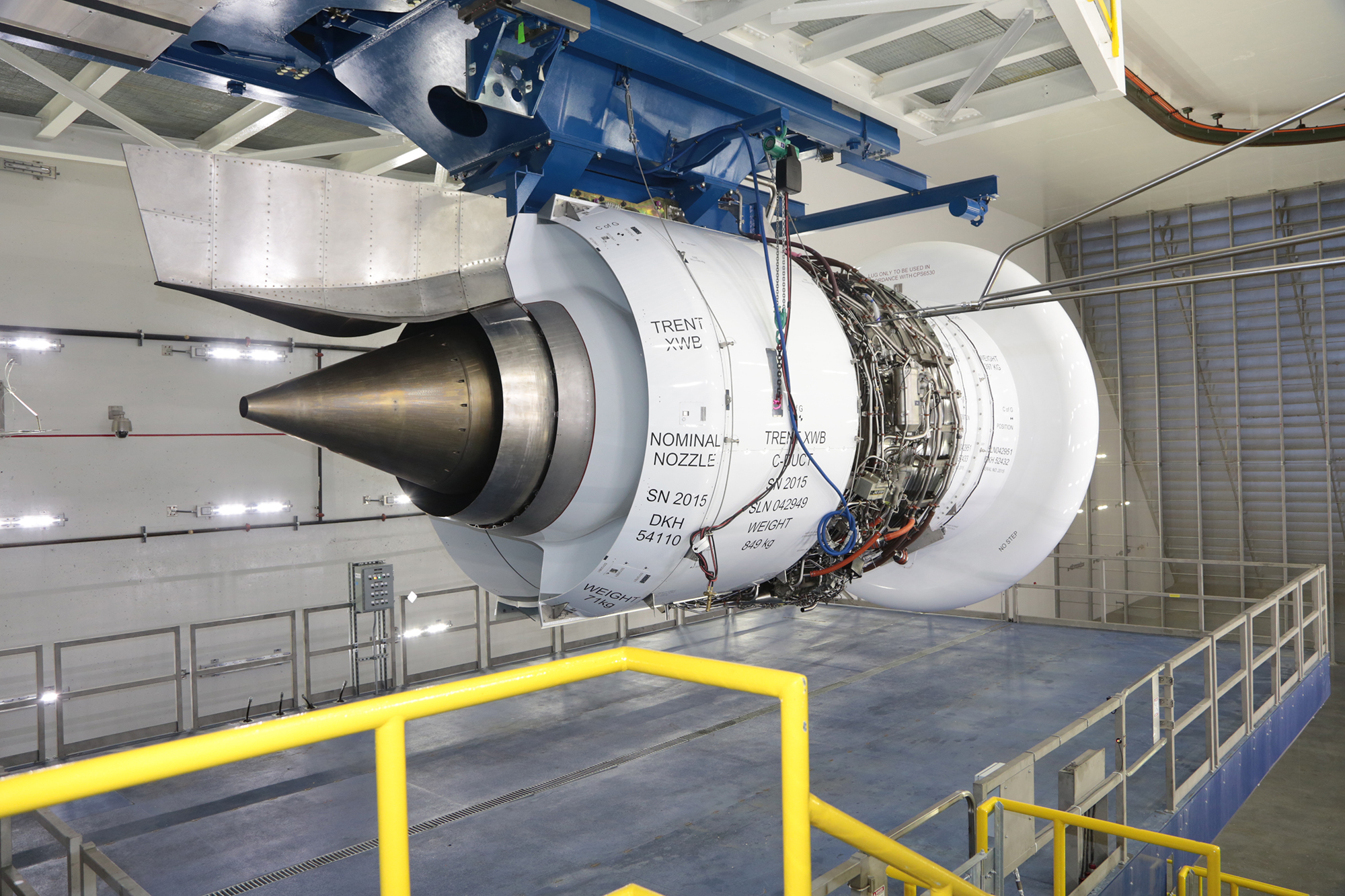
A Trent XWB in a Test Cell

Turbofan: BR715, CF34-3A/B/C, CF6-80A/A2/C2/E1, CFM56-3/5/7, PW1100G/1500G, PW2000, PW4000-94/100, Trent 1000, Trent 7000, Trent XWB

APU: GTCP 131-9B, GTCP 331-200

== Certifications ==
Delta TechOps has certified repair stations in the United States (FAA), the European Union (EASA) and other countries, including:

- USA: FAA – 121 Certified Repair Station No. DALA026A
- USA: FAA – 145 Certified Repair Station No. DALR026A
- EU: EASA – 145 Certified Repair Station No. EASA.145.4380
- Argentina: DNA – 145 Approved Maintenance Organization No. 1-B-318
- Bermuda: BDCA – Approved Maintenance Organization No. BDA/AMO/187
- Brazil: ANAC – 145 Approved Maintenance Organization 0604-04/ANAC
- Canada: TCCA/FAA – 145 Approved Maintenance Organization No. DALR026A
- Chile: DGAC – 145 Approved Maintenance Organization No. E-110
- China (PR): CAAC – 145 Approved Maintenance Organization No. F00100401
- Indonesia: DGCA – 145 Approved Maintenance Organization No. 145/62000
- Japan: JCAB – 145 Approved Maintenance Organization No. 192
- Korea (Republic of): KCASA – 145 Approved Maintenance Organization No. 2005-AMO F06
- Saudi Arabia: GACA – applied for
- Singapore: CAAS – applied for
- Trinidad & Tobago: TTCAA – 145 Approved Maintenance Organization No. TTAR/011
- ISO 9001: Delta TechOps Component, Engine and Landing Gear, No. CERT-0025376

== U.S. MRO service locations ==
While most of Delta TechOps' work is done at Hartsfield-Jackson Atlanta International Airport and Minneapolis-Saint Paul International Airport, other maintenance service locations include:

- Baltimore-Washington International Airport
- Bradley International Airport (Hartford)
- Charleston International Airport
- Cincinnati/Northern Kentucky International Airport
- Daniel K. Inouye International Airport (Honolulu)
- Denver International Airport
- Detroit Metropolitan Wayne County Airport
- Fort Lauderdale – Hollywood International Airport
- Harry Reid International Airport (Las Vegas)
- John F. Kennedy International Airport (New York)
- LaGuardia Airport (New York)
- Logan International Airport (Boston)
- Los Angeles International Airport
- Memphis International Airport
- Miami International Airport
- Narita International Airport
- Newark Liberty International Airport
- Orlando International Airport
- Philadelphia International Airport
- Phoenix Sky Harbor International Airport
- Portland International Airport
- Raleigh-Durham International Airport
- Ronald Reagan Washington National Airport
- Salt Lake City International Airport
- San Diego International Airport
- San Francisco International Airport
- Savannah/Hilton Head International Airport
- Seattle-Tacoma International Airport
- Tampa International Airport
