= Stephen F. Keating =

American businessman (1918–2001)

- Born: May 6, 1918; Graceville, Minnesota
- Died: August 27, 2001 (aged 83); Wayzata, Minnesota
- Education: University of Minnesota (BSc '40, JD '42)
- Spouse: Mary Elizabeth Davis (m. 1945)
- Military career
- Branch: United States Navy Reserve
- Service years: 1943–46

Stephen Flaherty Keating (May 6, 1918 – August 27, 2001) was an American technology executive. He was president of Honeywell from 1965 to 1974. He followed James H. Binger as president, which was an attempt to provide stability and continuity at Honeywell. A graduate of the University of Minnesota and the University of Minnesota Law School, Keating also practiced law, worked for the FBI, and was CEO of Toro (company). He was chairman of the Federal Reserve Bank of Minneapolis from 1979 to 1981.

== Influence ==
Keating was a member of the Minnesota Business Partnership.
