= Hib Sabin =

American sculptor and educator (born 1935)

Hib Sabin (born 1935) is an American sculptor and educator. He is known for his indigenous-style work in juniper wood. He carves spirit animal spirit bowls, spirit canoes, dream and dance sticks, and shamanistic masks. He lives in Santa Fe, New Mexico.

== Early life and education ==
Hilbert Speich Sabin was born in Baltimore and raised in New Jersey. His family was to an Episcopalian. Sabin received a BFA in Studio Art and Art History from University of Pennsylvania / Pennsylvania Academy of Fine Arts (coordinated program) and an MFA in Art History from the University of Pittsburgh.

== Career ==
=== In education ===
Sabin has taught art history at Shadyside Academy in Pittsburgh and at Franklin and Marshall College in Lancaster, Pennsylvania. He was an associate professor of studio art and art history at Dickinson College in Carlisle, Pennsylvania.

=== In art ===
Sabin has been creating art since 1957. His art is inspired by an interest in shamanism. While in Mexico on a sabbatical from teaching, Sabin studied shamanism from local curanderos. He also studied the spiritual traditions and mythologies of India and spent time with the Hadza people of Tanzania and Indigenous Australians, learning about their spiritual traditions. He has also stated specific poets, such as Dylan Thomas, William Butler Yeats, Robert Frost and Leonard Cohen, as inspirational to his work.

He has had at least twelve one-man exhibitions. In July 2003, he was the subject of an extensive article in Southwest Art magazine. His work has been displayed by the Port of Seattle at Seattle–Tacoma International Airport.

==== Selected exhibitions ====
Hib Sabin has had twelve one-man exhibitions since becoming an artist. He has been represented by the following galleries:

- 1957 – 1962: The Munson Gallery, Princeton, NJ
- 1965 – 1968: The Ben DuBose Gallery, Houston, TX
- 1968 – 1970: The Kiko Gallery, Houston, TX
- 1970 – 1974: The Meredith Long Gallery, Houston, TX
- 1974 – 1980: Hooks-Epstein Gallery, Houston, TX
- 1993 – 1995: Keshi, The Zuni Connection, Santa Fe, NM
- 1994 – 1997: The Adelante Gallery, Scottsdale, AZ
- 1995 – 1999: Maslak-McLeod Gallery, Santa Fe, NM
- 1998 – 1999: Wm. Zimmer Gallery, Mendocino, CA
- 1998 – 2000: Enchanted Earthworks, Tucson, AZ
- 1999 – 2000: Weyrich Gallery, Albuquerque, NM
- 1999 – 2000: Guadalupe Fine Arts, Santa Fe, NM
- 1997 – 2000: Clay & Fiber Gallery, Taos, NM
- 1996 – date: J. Seitz & Co., New Preston, CT
- 1998 – date: Bishop Gallery, Scottsdale, AZ/Allenspark, CO
- 1999 – date: Long Ago Far Away – Manchester Center, VT
- 2000 – date: Deloney-Newkirk, Santa Fe, NM
- 2000 – date: Turquoise Tortoise Gallery, Sedona, AZ
- 2001 – date: Alaska on Madison, New York City, NY
- 2001 – date: Stonington Gallery, Seattle, WA
- 2011 – date: L Ross Gallery, Memphis, TN

== Works ==
Books

- Sabin, Hib (2012). The Journey. Stonington Gallery.
