= Novar plc =

UK-based building supplies group

- Industry: packaging industry
- Founded: 1921
- Defunct: 1 April 2005
- Fate: Acquired by Honeywell
- Successor: Novar Controls
- Headquarters: Weybridge, Surrey, England, UK

Novar plc (formerly Caradon plc) was a UK-based international building supplies group. It originated in 1921 as the Metal Box Company, formed through the amalgamation of several businesses involved in canning and printing. By the 1970s, Metal Box had become a market leader in these sectors.

During the 1980s, the company diversified into the building supplies industry, eventually operating around 30 companies that provided products to the construction and DIY sectors. In the early 1990s, the company was rebranded as Caradon plc, reflecting its growing focus on building products.

In 2000, Caradon sold off its plumbing and bathroom brands, including the Caradon name, and continued its operations under the name Novar plc. The rebranding reflected a strategic shift toward technology and controls, particularly through its subsidiary Novar Controls.

In 2005, Novar plc was acquired by Honeywell, a U.S.-based multinational conglomerate. Following the acquisition, Novar’s UK operations were largely dismantled or integrated into Honeywell’s business divisions, effectively rendering Novar plc defunct.

== Roots in the printing and canning industries ==
The canned food industry—known as "tinning" in the UK—has been used to preserve food since the 19th century. Prior to the widespread adoption of tinning, food was commonly preserved by salting, drying, or consumed fresh. The early can manufacturing industry consisted largely of small, family-owned businesses, which operated with limited competition due to the vast and expanding market.

One notable early can maker was Robert Barclay, who also owned a printing business established in 1855. A distant relative of the founders of Barclays Bank, Barclay printed cheques for the bank. He later partnered with his brother-in-law John Fry to form the company Barclay & Fry. Together, they worked to develop the process of offset lithography, initially to improve the printing of labels for biscuit tins.

At the time, decorated tins were especially popular in the United Kingdom, and many households collected them. Before the advent of offset lithography, most tins were decorated by hand, which was time-consuming and costly.

Following Barclay's death, the printing process was licensed to Huntley, Boorne & Stevens, a tin manufacturer producing biscuit tins for Huntley & Palmers. They employed the new lithographic method to efficiently apply labels to their products. As this innovation spread, it lowered labour costs and increased profitability across the tin manufacturing industry.

However, labour conditions remained poor until the introduction of the Trade Boards Act 1909, which mandated improvements to wages and working conditions in several industries, including tin manufacturing. In response, several tin manufacturers organized themselves into the UK Tin Box Makers Union, aiming to safeguard their businesses and standardize practices across the industry.

== Founding of Metal Box & Printing Industries ==
During the First World War, the tinning industry experienced increased demand due to the production of ration tins for British troops. With wartime restrictions imposed by the UK government on the supply of tin, many companies that formed the federation collaborated closely. Following the war, four of these firms—Hudson Scott, F. Atkins & Co., Henry Grant & Co., and Barclay & Fry—joined forces to create Allied Tin Box Makers Limited. Although they operated under a single company to control the market and facilitate acquisitions, each constituent company retained its private ownership and continued to manage its own affairs. In 1922, after establishing a strong position in the UK market, the company was renamed Metal Box & Printing Industries.

This market control was soon challenged by the introduction of the American semi-automatic can-making system, which significantly increased production speed compared to the traditional British methods. The business interests of G. E. Williamson's family, who had declined to join Allied Tin Box, acquired this new machinery and secured a government contract. This advancement attracted considerable attention from American canning companies interested in entering the British tin manufacturing market.

The first American firm to attempt establishing a presence in the UK was the American Can Company. It purchased a small local company, which it renamed the British Can Company, and soon attempted to acquire Metal Box. In response, Metal Box arranged a strategic partnership to maintain its independence while fostering growth.

Subsequently, Metal Box negotiated a deal with American Can’s US-based rival, the Continental Can Company. This agreement involved an exchange of stock shares and granted Metal Box exclusive rights in Great Britain to purchase machinery, receive technical support, training, and access patents from Continental Can. This effectively eliminated domestic competition, as no other UK company could match Metal Box's capabilities.

Less than a year after this agreement, the British Can Company encountered severe difficulties. Metal Box ultimately agreed to acquire British Can from its parent company, on the condition that British Can accepted a non-compete clause preventing it from operating in Britain and Ireland for the following 21 years.

== The Great Depression era and further growth ==
Metal Box, unlike many of its competitors, experienced growth during the Great Depression. As smaller can-making companies collapsed, Metal Box was able to acquire them, thereby consolidating its position in the market.

The company prospered by licensing its advanced technology to customers. While it did not intend to become a food producer itself, Metal Box sought to increase public interest in canned foods. To that end, it established a dedicated publicity department to promote the benefits of canned products.

At this time, Continental Can Company remained Metal Box’s principal business partner. The two companies had effectively divided the global markets between themselves. In the late 1930s, Metal Box made plans to modernise and revolutionise its packaging technologies. However, the outbreak of the Second World War put a halt to these developments.

During the war, Metal Box’s factories were requisitioned for wartime production. Facilities that once produced paint tins were repurposed to manufacture casings for anti-tank mines, while other lines produced containers for gas masks and renewed production of ration tins and shell casings. Despite its contributions to the war effort, Metal Box saw its profits decline, falling to £242,428 by 1945.

== Return to packaging production ==
Around 1943, as the tide of the Second World War began to turn in favour of the Allied powers, Metal Box shifted its focus toward postwar opportunities. The company began exploring alternative packaging materials, including paper, foil, and plastics, in anticipation of a booming postwar economy. However, in the late 1940s, Metal Box faced a significant setback when the United States Department of Justice filed an antitrust suit against its American partner, Continental Can Company, and began scrutinising the nature of their partnership.

As a result, the companies were compelled to revise their agreement in 1950. Under the new terms, their collaboration was restricted to the exchange of technological know-how, with all mutual ventures and market control arrangements dissolved. This modified agreement was later renewed and expanded in 1970, with plans for it to remain in effect until 1990.

By the 1960s, Metal Box had established itself as the leading supplier of packaging to some of the world’s largest corporations. Clients included Unilever, Heinz, Imperial Chemical Industries (ICI), Imperial Tobacco, British American Tobacco (BAT), Nestlé, and Shell. In 1970, the company expanded its UK product lines to include aerosols, plastic film, engineering components, and central heating equipment through the acquisition of Wallis Tin Stamping, Brown Flexible Packaging, and Bibby & Gregory. Simultaneously, Metal Box expanded internationally by establishing operations or subsidiaries in countries such as Italy, Malaysia, Japan, and Iran, while modernising existing facilities in India, South Africa, and France. Despite this global presence, the majority of its business remained centred in the UK.

During the 1970s, Metal Box’s packaging subsidiaries began to face intensified competition both domestically and internationally. The situation was exacerbated in 1978 when the company terminated its long-standing licensing agreement with Continental Can. The latter responded by re-entering the UK market, constructing a two-piece aluminium can manufacturing plant in Wales. Two-piece cans represented the latest innovation in packaging technology at the time. Confronted with mounting domestic challenges, Metal Box increasingly looked overseas for growth opportunities.

In 1979, Metal Box opened its own two-piece can manufacturing facility in Carson, California, which went on to supply Pepsi-Cola. Around the same time, the company entered a licensing agreement with the French packaging firm Carnaud, providing equipment and expertise to establish a two-piece can production plant in Belgium.

== The 1980s, recession and re-imagining ==
Metal Box faced significant challenges in the early 1980s. The company struggled with the effects of a global recession, poor management decisions, and growing competition in the canned food packaging market. In response, the board brought in new leadership to stabilise and revitalise the business. Brian Smith, known for his role in turning around ICI, was appointed chairman, and Murray Stuart became chief executive.

In 1988, seeking to downplay the company's historical association with tin packaging and highlight its diversification into other industries, Smith and Stuart rebranded the business as MB Group. Under their leadership, the company expanded its operations and became the largest manufacturer of heating radiators in Europe through its Stelrad division.

During this period, MB Group also developed a bathroom products division under the Stelrad Doulton brand. Meanwhile, in the United States, its Clarke Checks subsidiary had grown to become the fourth-largest cheque printing company in the country.

In October 1988, MB Group agreed to merge its packaging division with that of the French company Carnaud, forming CMB Packaging SA. This new entity became the third-largest packaging company in the world. Following the merger, MB Group continued to expand its heating and bathroom product portfolio by acquiring Caradon plc, whose well-known brands at the time included Mira Showers and Twyford Bathrooms.

After these strategic moves, Brian Smith retired, and the company was renamed MB-Caradon plc. Leadership passed to Murray Stuart, while Peter Jansen, former CEO of Caradon, was appointed Chief Executive. Together, they oversaw the integration of Caradon's operations into the existing Stelrad business.

== 1990s and decline ==
In April 1993, MB-Caradon sold its stake in CMB (then known as Carnaud-Metalbox), thereby fully divesting from its historical roots in the metal packaging industry—an effort the company had been pursuing since the early 1980s. Following the acquisition of RTZ Pillar, the company was renamed Caradon plc.

In 1994, Caradon acquired a 43% stake in Weru AG, which was then the leading manufacturer of doors and windows in Germany.

In response to mounting competitive and structural pressures, CEO Peter Jansen initiated a major restructuring of the company in late 1995. This included the elimination of 1,600 jobs and a full tier of management. The following year, in 1996, Caradon divested 18 of its business units as part of a broader streamlining strategy.

== Sale, closure, and aftermath ==
Caradon Plumbing Solutions was acquired by HSBC Private Equity on 9 October 2000 for £442 million.

Following the sale, Caradon Stelrad plc was formed from the Stelrad Radiators and Ideal Boilers subsidiaries, backed by a consortium including BNP Paribas and the Royal Bank of Scotland (RBS). The bathroom division, Twyford Bathrooms, was sold in January 2001 to Finnish company Sanitec Group for £84 million. Later that year, on 19 July 2001, Mira Showers and Alstone shower cubicles were sold to the Kohler Company for £301 million, forming Kohler Mira Ltd.

In 2013, Caradon Stelrad was renamed the Ideal Stelrad Group after Bregal Capital acquired it from BNP Paribas. The deal went against the recommendations of RBS, which held a 15% stake in the company and had advised selling the group’s two operating divisions separately.

This separation eventually occurred: in 2015, Bregal Capital sold the Ideal Boilers division to Groupe Atlantic, effectively splitting the group. However, Stelrad continues to operate under the Ideal Stelrad Group name and markets Ideal Boilers on its website.

With the divestment of its UK-based Caradon operations, the company shifted its focus to its U.S. interests and rebranded as Novar plc.

In 2004, Melrose Industries launched a hostile takeover bid for Novar plc, but eventually withdrew after a competing offer from Honeywell in 2005 was accepted.

Following the acquisition, Honeywell dismantled the group, effectively ending Novar’s UK operations. However, the Novar name persists in the United States as Novar Controls (known simply as Novar since 2017), a company originally established in 1964 and headquartered in Cleveland, Ohio. Novar develops technologies for centralized control and management of HVAC, refrigeration, and lighting systems for commercial clients, specializing in direct digital control and energy management solutions.
