= Albert Butz =

Swiss businessman (1849-1904)

- Born: 1849 Switzerland
- Died: 1905 (aged 55–56) United States
- Occupation: Inventor and businessman

Albert Butz (1849–1905) was a Swiss-born American inventor and businessman who founded the Butz Thermo-electric Regulator Company that, through a series of re-organizations, name changes, and mergers, became Honeywell, Incorporated.

== Early life ==
In 1857, at 8 years of age, he immigrated (assumed with his family) to the United States.

At age 16, he enlisted in the Union Army, serving in "Wisconsin's 47th Infantry"—for the last six months of the conflict; the company did not see combat and no event of note took place.

== Later life and career ==
In 1881, he appeared as a resident of Saint Paul, Minnesota.

In 1884, Butz and partner R.J. Mendenhall formed a company called The Butz and Mendenhall Hand Grenade Fire Extinguisher Company. No documentation to support their product being sold, let alone advertised or manufactured.

=== Damper flapper ===
The damper flapper could control a coal fire furnace by operating the furnace damper from a thermostat. In 1885, Butz decided to patent his heat controller and establish a company to make and sell it. It is believed that Mendenhall urged Butz to patent, manufacture, and sell the damper flapper. The patent attorneys who assisted Butz in preparing the application were Amasa Paul, Rufus Sanford, and T. Dwight Mervin. A group of investors, known as Hay & Company Investors and Business Brokers provided Butz with the capital required to incorporate Butz Thermoelectric Regulator Company on April 23, 1886. May 4, 1886, Butz's patent was granted.

It is not known if any sales of his product occurred—no recorded documentation exist to support sales.

In 1888, Butz abandoned his business and moved to Chicago. The law firm retained the Butz patents. It is not known why Butz left Minneapolis nor why he transferred his patents to the law firm. In 1888, Butz's attorneys had renamed the business the Consolidated Temperature Controlling Company.

Early in 1892, the management of the Consolidated Temperature Controlling Company renamed the company the Electric Thermostat Company.

On August 16, 1892, the stockholders of the Electric Thermostat Company BBC agreed to sell an extensive list of patents to W.R. Sweatt for the sum of $1.00.

On October 5, 1892, the directors changed the name to the Electric Heat Regulator Company, recapitalized it, and elected William Sweatt as both Secretary and Treasurer. The stockholders agreed to accept the assets of the Electric Thermostat Company and to assume the liabilities of Sweatt as a trustee.

In 1912 the company was renamed The Minneapolis Heat Regulator Company.

In 1927 the Minneapolis Heat Regulator Company and Honeywell Heating Specialties Company merged to form the Minneapolis-Honeywell Regulator Company.

In 1964 the corporate name was changed to Honeywell Inc.

In 1999 AlliedSignal acquired Honeywell and renamed the merged company Honeywell International Inc.

== Legacy ==
Minnesota Inventors Hall of Fame, 1992 inductee

=== Patents ===
- 1886 Thermo-electric damper-regulator and alarm (341,092 and 347,866)
- 1888 Automatic temperature control (390,281)
- 1889 Liquid vending apparatus (401,250)
- 1889 Thermostat (409,316)
- 1890 Apparatus for regulating steam in buildings (441,745)
- 1893 Temperature regulator for electric heaters (510,889)
- 1894 Thermostatic valve (525,330)
- 1900 Device for regulating temperature in steam-heated buildings (660,209)
- 1902 Thermostatic circuit closure (705,379)
- 1903 Electric damper regulator (736,490)
- 1903 Thermostatic heat regulator (739,055)
- 1909 Temperature regulating apparatus (910,269)
