= Darius Adamczyk =

Polish-American businessman

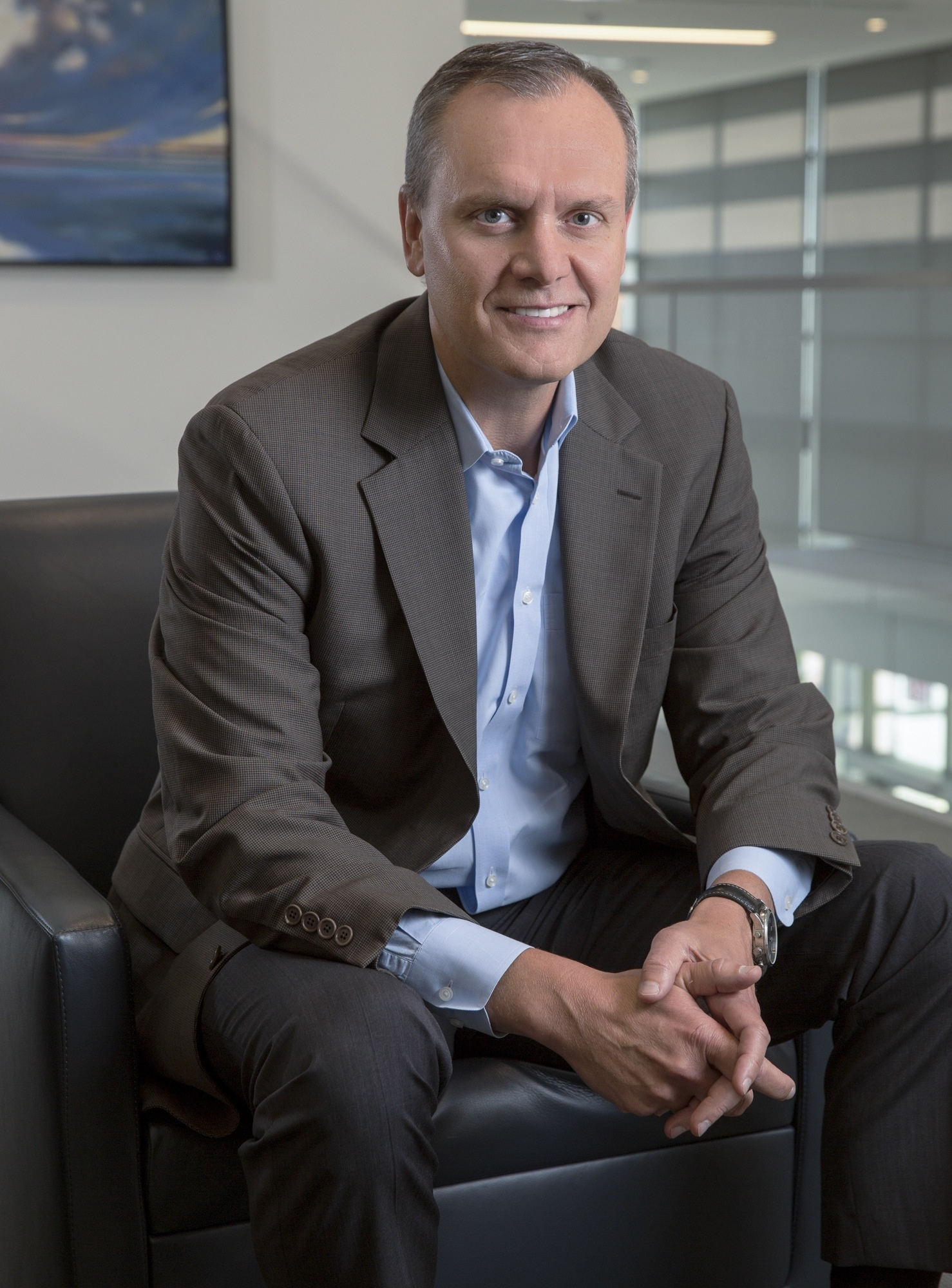
- Adamczyk in 2017
- Born: February 8, 1966 (age 59); Poland
- Other names: Dariusz (different spelling of first name)
- Education: Michigan State University (BS); Syracuse University (MS); Harvard University (MBA)
- Title: Chairman of Honeywell
- Term: April 2020 – present
- Predecessor: David M. Cote
- Successor: Vimal Kapur

Darius Adamczyk (born February 8, 1966) is a Polish-American businessman. He is the chairman (and former CEO) of Honeywell, an American multinational conglomerate.

== Early life and education ==
Adamczyk was born in Poland on February 8, 1966, and immigrated to the US at the age of 11, speaking no English. His family settled in Grand Rapids, Michigan. He went to Michigan State University to study electrical and computer engineering, where he received his bachelor's degree. He received a master's degree in computer engineering from Syracuse University, and an MBA from Harvard University.

== Career ==
Adamczyk started his career with General Electric in 1988, as an electrical engineer. He later spent four years at Booz Allen Hamilton, a consulting firm, followed by positions at Ingersoll-Rand PLC and Metrologic.

In 2008, Adamczyk was CEO of Metrologic Inc when Honeywell purchased the holding company for $720 million. After the purchase, Adamczyk joined Honeywell's executive team. He became president of Honeywell Process Solutions in 2012. After two years in this role, he then became president and CEO of Honeywell Performance Materials and Technologies in 2014.

In June 2016, it was announced that David M. Cote would step down as CEO of Honeywell at the end of March 2017 and Adamczyk would succeed him. Cote continued as executive chairman through April 2018, when he stepped down and Adamczyk was elected chairman.

Fortune Magazine reported on Adamczyk’s leadership style, "Adamczyk used a similar strategy in his various roles: apply analytical rigor to identify areas of potential growth, chop deadweight, and lean into software and automation." After assuming his post, Adamczyk ordered a comprehensive portfolio review process that included input from industry experts and stakeholders. The company announced two major divestments that represented about $7.5 billion in revenues. The company also became the first major American public company to disclose its ratio of CEO pay to median employee. Adamczyk is also noted for building on the company's Sentience platform and expanded it into Honeywell Forge, a cloud-based IoT platform and product development framework for the development of scalable software.

=== Awards and memberships ===
The Carnegie Corporation of New York honored Adamczyk with 2019 Great Immigrant Award. Adamczyk was awarded the Foreign Policy Association’s Corporate Social Responsibility Award. He is a member of The Business Roundtable, The Business Council, and Council on Foreign Relations. President Trump selected Adamczyk to join the Great American Economic Revival Industry Groups.

On June 1, 2023 Adamczyk became Executive Chairman of Honeywell and was succeeded by Vimal Kapur as CEO.

== Selected publications ==
- Zur Stellung Polens im modernen Weltsystem der frühen Neuzeit ("On Poland's position in the modern world system of the Early Modern Age"), Verlag Dr. Kovac, Hamburg 2001 (originally Hannover University thesis, 1999). ISBN 3-8300-0375-7
- Silberströme und die Einbeziehung Osteuropas in das islamische Handelssystem, ("Stream of silver: Eastern Europe's involvement in the Islamic trading system") in Carl-Hans Hauptmeyer et al. (Hg.): Die Welt querdenken. Verlag Peter Lang, Frankfurt am Main 2003, pp. 107–123. ISBN 3-6313-9374-1
- Friesen, Wikinger, Araber. Die Ostseewelt zwischen Dorestad und Samarkand, ca. 700-1100, ("Frisians, Vikings, Arabs: the Baltic world, from Dorestad to Samarkand, ca. 700-1100") in Andrea Komlosy, Hans-Heinrich Nolte, Imbi Sooman (Hg.): Ostsee 700-2000. Gesellschaft – Wirtschaft – Kultur. Promedia Verlag, Vienna 2007, pp. 32–48. ISBN 3-8537-1276-2
- (Editor and co-author) Quo vadis Asien? China, Indien, Russland, Mittlerer Osten und Zentralasien im globalen Kontext. ("Status quo for Asia? China, India, Russia, the Middle East and Central Asia in the global context"), Wochenschau Verlag, Schwalbach/Ts. 2009. ISBN 3-8997-4528-0

== See also ==
- List of chief executive officers
