= Tridium =

American company

Tridium, Inc.
- Type: Subsidiary
- Industry: Building automation
- Founded: 1995; 31 years ago
- Founder: John Sublett
- Headquarters: Richmond, Virginia, U.S.
- Products: Niagara Framework
- Parent: Honeywell
- Website: tridium.com

Tridium Inc. is an American engineering hardware and software company based in Richmond, Virginia, whose products facilitate and integrate the automation of building and other engineering control systems. Since November 2005, the company has operated as an independent business entity of Honeywell International Inc.

== History ==
Tridium Inc. was founded in 1995. In 1999, Tridium launched the Niagara Framework, a software infrastructure that connects all systems and devices to a central console.

In 2002, John Petze became president and CEO, replacing Jerry Frank.

The company was acquired by Honeywell International Inc in 2005.

== Products ==
Tridium's products facilitate by integrating building automation using open and proprietary communications protocols such as Modbus, Lonworks and BACnet.

Tridium is the developer of Niagara Framework. The Niagara Framework is a universal software infrastructure that allows building controls integrators, HVAC and mechanical contractors to build custom, web-enabled applications for accessing, automating and controlling smart devices real-time via local network or over the Internet.

== Security ==
In July 2012, an investigation by The Washington Post reported that an unknown number of networks running Niagara were vulnerable to hacking, despite the framework's widespread use – by the newspaper's count, more than 11 million devices in 52 countries were connected through Niagara at the time, including systems in U.S. federal government buildings, U.S. military installations, and hospitals. According to the report, independent security researchers Billy Rios and Terry McCorkle identified a directory traversal vulnerability that allowed remote attackers to download and decrypt Niagara user names and passwords, and reported it to the U.S. Department of Homeland Security, which recommended that Tridium improve customer security training.

Tridium co-founder and chief technology officer John Sublett said the company learned of related vulnerabilities roughly a year earlier, after an audit by a Niagara customer managing Pentagon facilities, and issued a security bulletin to customers describing mitigation measures around the time of the article's publication.

The U.S. Cybersecurity and Infrastructure Security Agency (CISA) subsequently issued Industrial Control Systems advisories documenting further vulnerabilities in Niagara, including a directory traversal vulnerability in NiagaraAX, a cross-site scripting vulnerability (CVE-2018-18985) affecting Niagara Enterprise Security, Niagara AX, and Niagara 4, and a denial-of-service vulnerability.

In July 2025, researchers at Nozomi Networks Labs disclosed ten vulnerabilities in Niagara Framework and Niagara Enterprise Security, affecting versions up to 4.10u10, 4.14u1, and 4.15. Several of the flaws received a CVSS score of 9.8, and two of them could reportedly be chained to achieve root-level remote code execution on affected devices under certain misconfigurations, such as disabled encryption on a network device. Honeywell released patched versions of Niagara Framework and Niagara Enterprise Security (4.10u11, 4.14u2, and 4.15u1) in response.
