= Honeywell =

American defunct multinational industrial automation company

Honeywell International Inc.

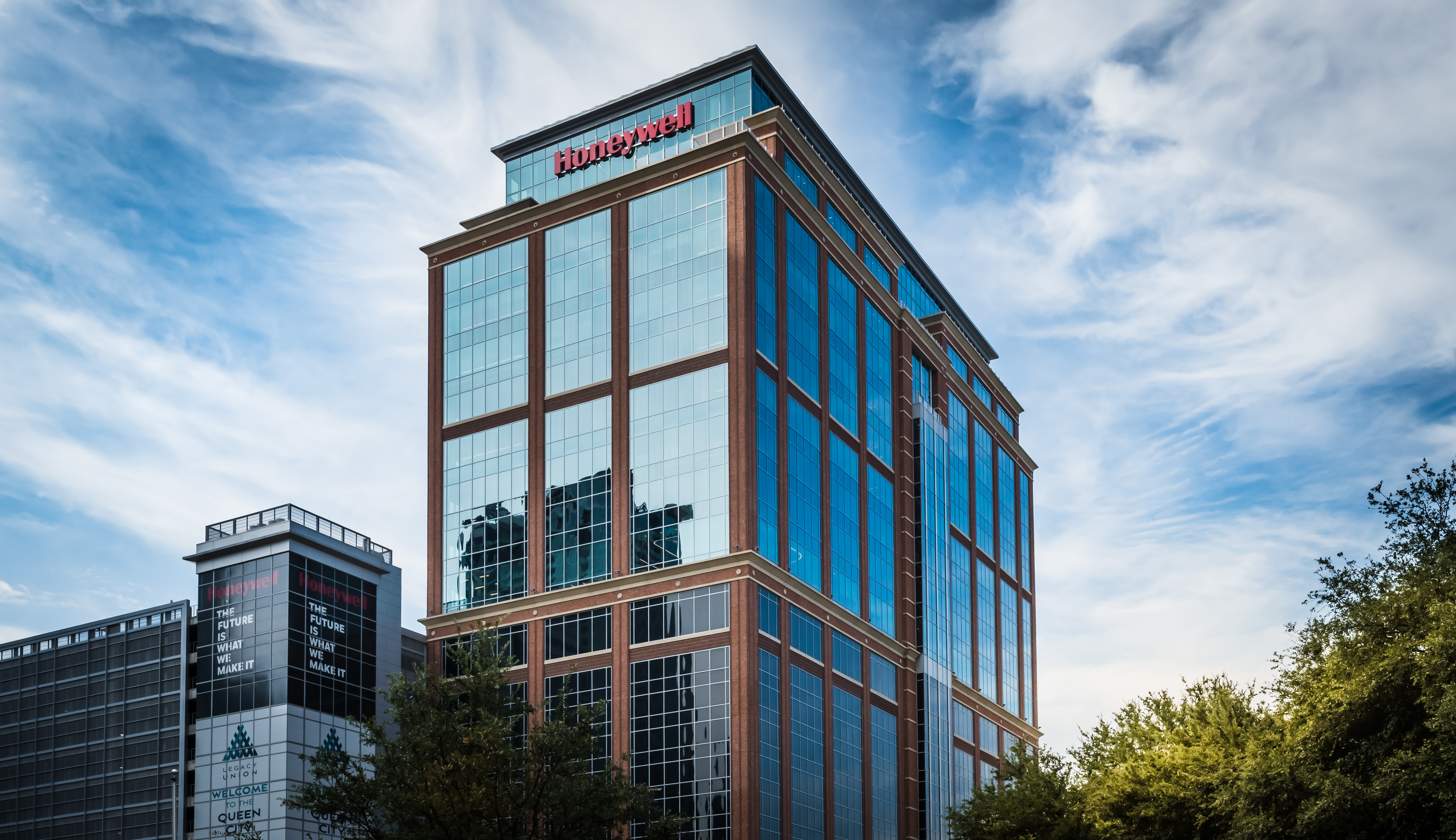
- Headquarters in Charlotte, North Carolina
- Trade name: Honeywell Technologies
- Type: Public company
- Traded as: Nasdaq: HON; S&P 500 component
- Industry: Industrial automation
- Predecessor: Honeywell Inc.; AlliedSignal Inc.
- Founded: 1906; 120 years ago in Wabash, Indiana, U.S.
- Founder: Mark C. Honeywell
- Headquarters: Charlotte, North Carolina, U.S.
- Area served: Worldwide
- Key people: Vimal Kapur (Chairman and CEO)
- Products: Building automation systems; Industrial automation systems; Process control technologies; Sensors and control systems; Industrial software; Safety and security technologies
- Revenue: 35,466,000,000 United States dollar (2022)
- Operating income: 5,542,000,000 United States dollar (2021)
- Net income: 4,966,000,000 United States dollar (2022)
- Number of employees: 99,000 (2021)
- Website: www.honeywell.com

Honeywell International Inc. was an American publicly traded, multinational automation corporation headquartered in Charlotte, North Carolina. It primarily operated in three areas of business: building automation, industrial automation, and energy and sustainability solutions (ESS). Honeywell also operated Sandia National Laboratories under contract with the U.S. Department of Energy. Honeywell was a Fortune 500 company, ranked 115th in 2023. In 2025, the corporation had a global workforce of approximately 101,000 employees. In 2025, its chairman and chief executive officer was Vimal Kapur.

The corporation's name, Honeywell International Inc., was a product of the merger of Honeywell Inc. and AlliedSignal in 1999. The corporation headquarters were consolidated with AlliedSignal's headquarters in Morristown, New Jersey. The combined company chose the name "Honeywell" because of the considerable brand recognition. Honeywell was a component of the Dow Jones Industrial Average index from 1999 to 2008. Prior to 1999, its corporate predecessors were included dating back to 1925, including early entrants in the computing and thermostat industries.

In 2020, Honeywell rejoined the Dow Jones Industrial Average index. In 2021, it moved its stock listing from the New York Stock Exchange to the Nasdaq.

In 2025, Honeywell announced it would split into three companies: Honeywell Technologies, Honeywell Aerospace, and Solstice Advanced Materials. It has been estimated that the aerospace and automation businesses could be worth as much as $104 billion and $94 billion, respectively, after the split.

== History ==
The Butz Thermo-Electric Regulator Company was founded in 1885 when the Swiss-born Albert Butz invented the damper-flapper, a thermostat used to control coal furnaces, bringing automated heating system regulation into homes. In 1888, after a falling out with his investors, Butz left the company and transferred the patents to the legal firm Paul, Sanford, and Merwin, who renamed the company the Consolidated Temperature Controlling Company.

As the years passed, CTCC struggled with debt and the company underwent several name changes. After it was renamed the Electric Heat Regulator Company in 1893, W. R. Sweatt, a stockholder in the company, was sold "an extensive list of patents" and named secretary-treasurer. By 1900, Sweatt had bought out the remaining shares of the company from the other stockholders.

=== 1906 Honeywell Heating Specialty Company founded ===
In 1906, Mark Honeywell founded the Honeywell Heating Specialty Company in Wabash, Indiana, to manufacture and market his invention, the mercury seal generator.

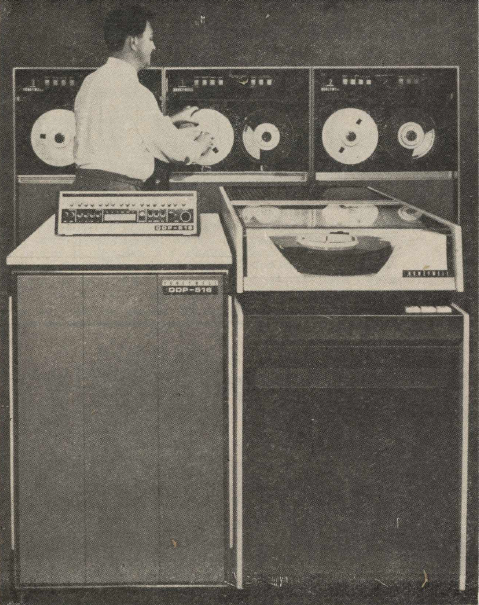
The Honeywell 516, later used as the Interface Message Processor

=== 1922–1934 Mergers and acquisitions ===
As Honeywell's company grew, thanks in part to the acquisition of Jewell Manufacturing Company in 1922 to better automate his heating system, it began to clash with the Electric Heat Regulator Company now-renamed Minneapolis Heat Regulator Company. In 1927, this led to the merging of both companies into the publicly held Minneapolis-Honeywell Regulator Company. Honeywell was named the company's first president, alongside W.R. Sweatt as its first chairman.

In 1929, combined assets were valued at over $3.5 million, with less than $1 million in liabilities just months before Black Monday. In 1931, Minneapolis-Honeywell began a period of expansion and acquisition when it purchased the Time-O-Stat Controls Company, giving the company access to a greater number of patents for its controls systems.

W.R. Sweatt and his son Harold provided 75 years of uninterrupted leadership for the company. W.R. Sweatt faced hardship and turned an innovative idea – thermostatic heating control – into a successful business.

=== 1934–1941 International growth ===
Harold took over in 1934, leading Honeywell through a period of growth and global expansion that set the stage for Honeywell to become a global technology leader. The merger into the Minneapolis-Honeywell Regulator Company proved to be a saving grace for the corporation.

1934 marked Minneapolis-Honeywell's first foray into the international market, when it acquired the Brown Instrument Company and inherited its relationship with the Yamatake Company of Tokyo, a Japan-based distributor. Later in 1934, Minneapolis-Honeywell started distributorships across Canada, as well as one in the Netherlands, its first European office. This expansion into international markets continued in 1936, with its first distributorship in London, as well as its first foreign assembly facility being established in Canada. By 1937, ten years after the merger, Minneapolis-Honeywell had over 3,000 employees, with $16 million in annual revenue.

=== World War II ===
With the outbreak of World War II, Minneapolis-Honeywell was approached by the US military for engineering and manufacturing projects. In 1941, Minneapolis-Honeywell developed a superior tank periscope, camera stabilizers, and the C-1 autopilot.

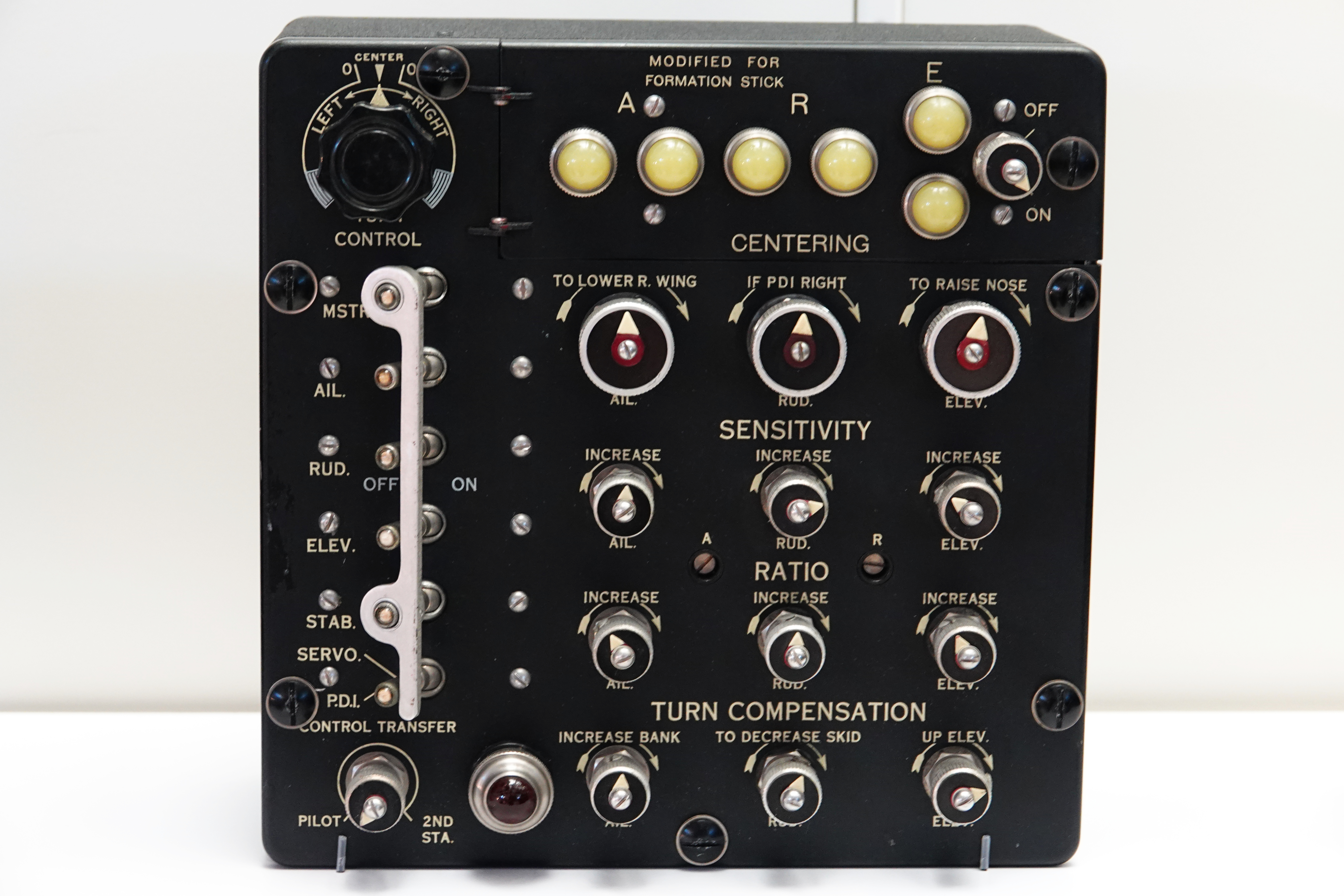
A World War II-era Honeywell C-1 autopilot control panel

The C-1 revolutionized precision bombing and was ultimately used on the two B-29 bombers that dropped atomic bombs on Japan in 1945. The success of these projects led Minneapolis-Honeywell to open an Aero division in Chicago on October 5, 1942. This division was responsible for the development of the formation stick to control autopilots, more accurate fuel quantity indicators for aircraft, and the turbo supercharger.

In 1950, Minneapolis-Honeywell's Aero division was contracted for the controls on the first US nuclear submarine, USS Nautilus. In 1951, the company acquired Intervox Company for their sonar, ultrasonic, and telemetry technologies. Honeywell also helped develop and manufacture the RUR-5 ASROC for the US Navy.

=== 1950–1970s ===
In 1953, in cooperation with the USAF Wright-Air Development Center, Honeywell developed an automated control unit, that could control an aircraft through various stages of a flight, from taxiing to takeoff to the point where the aircraft neared its destination and the pilot took over for landing. Called the Automatic Master Sequence Selector, the onboard control operated similarly to a player piano to relay instructions to the aircraft's autopilot at certain way points during the flight, significantly reducing the pilot's workload. Technologically, this effort had parallels to contemporary efforts in missile guidance and numerical control. Honeywell also developed the Wagtail missile with the USAF.

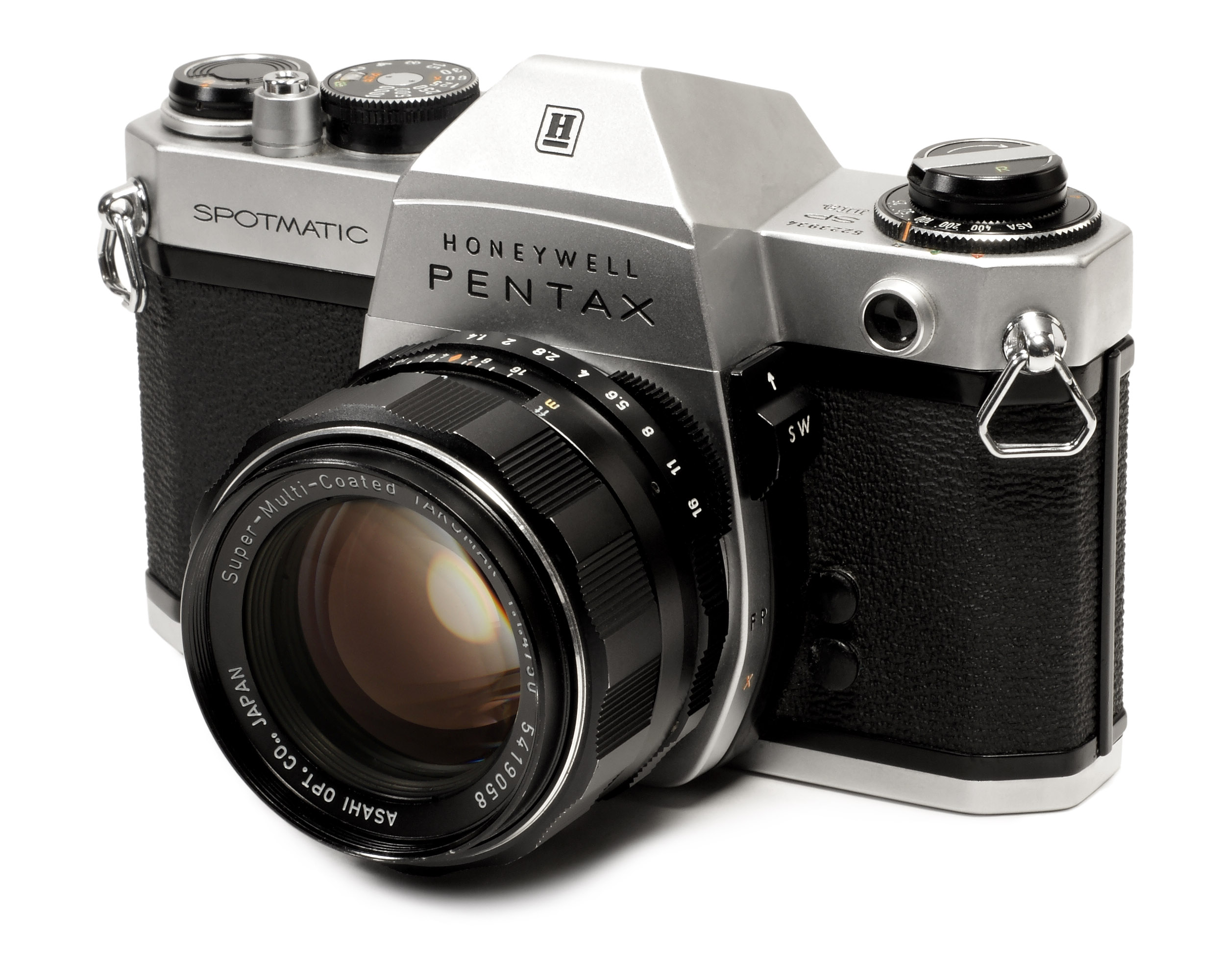
A Honeywell-Pentax-Spotmatic

From the 1950s until the mid-1970s, Honeywell was the United States' importer of Japanese company Asahi Optical's Pentax cameras and photographic equipment. These products were labeled "Heiland Pentax" and "Honeywell Pentax" in the U.S. In 1953, Honeywell introduced its most famous product, the T-86 Round thermostat.

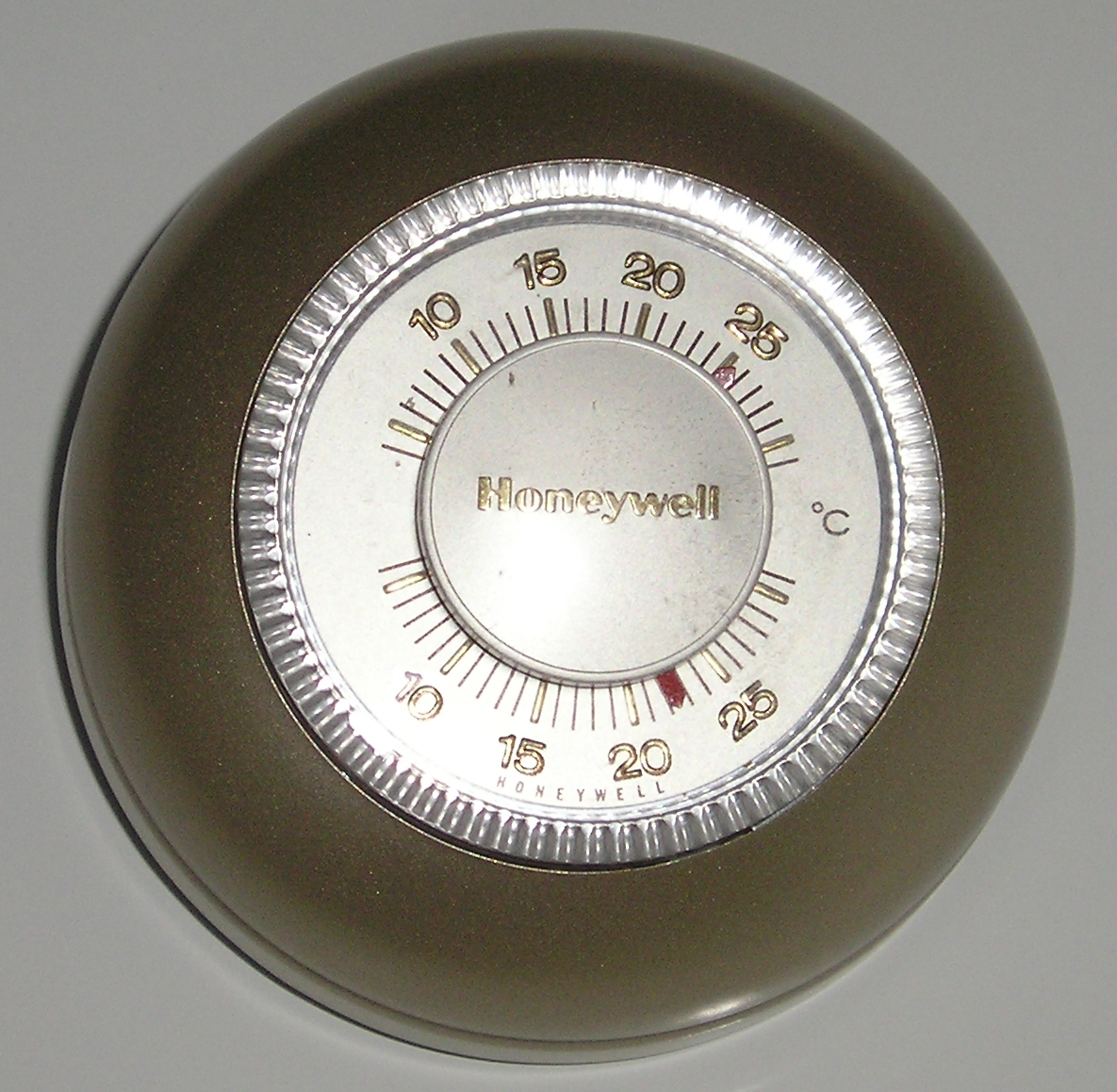
A Honeywell thermostat

In 1961, James H. Binger became Honeywell's president and in 1965 its chairman. Binger revamped the company sales approach, placing emphasis on profits rather than on volume. He stepped up the company's international expansion – it had six plants producing 12% of the company's revenue. He officially changed the company's corporate name from "Minneapolis-Honeywell Regulator Co." to "Honeywell", to better represent their colloquial name. Throughout the 1960s, Honeywell continued to acquire other businesses, including Security Burglar Alarm Company in 1969.

In the 1970s, after one member of a group called FREE on the Minneapolis campus (U of M) of the University of Minnesota asked five major companies with local offices to explain their attitudes toward gay men and women, three responded quickly, insisting that they did not discriminate against gay people in their hiring policies. Only Honeywell objected to hiring gay people. Later in the 1970s, when faced with a denial of access to students, Honeywell "quietly [reversed] its hiring policy".

The beginning of the 1970s saw Honeywell focus on process controls, with Honeywell merging its computer operations with GE's information systems in 1970, and later acquiring GE's process control business. With the acquisition, Honeywell took over responsibility for GE's ongoing Multics operating system project. The design and features of Multics greatly influenced the Unix operating system. Multics influenced many of the features of Honeywell/GE's GECOS and GCOS8 General Comprehensive Operating System operating systems. Honeywell, Groupe Bull, and Control Data Corporation formed a joint venture in Magnetic Peripherals Inc. which became a major player in the hard disk drive market.

Honeywell was the worldwide leader in 14-inch disk drive technology in the OEM marketplace in the 1970s and early 1980s, especially with its SMD (Storage Module Drive) and CMD (Cartridge Module Drive). In the second half of the 1970s, Honeywell started to look to international markets again, acquiring the French Compagnie Internationale pour l’Informatique in 1976. In 1984, Honeywell formed Honeywell High Tech Trading to lease their foreign marketing and distribution to other companies abroad, in order to establish a better position in those markets. Under Binger's stewardship from 1961 to 1978 he expanded the company into such fields as defense, aerospace, and computing.

During and after the Vietnam Era, Honeywell's defense division produced a number of products, including cluster bombs, missile guidance systems, napalm, and land mines. Minnesota-Honeywell Corporation completed flight tests on an inertia guidance sub-system for the X-20 project at Eglin Air Force Base, Florida, utilizing an NF-101B Voodoo by August 1963. The X-20 project was canceled in December 1963. The Honeywell Project, founded in 1968, organized protests against the company to persuade it to abandon weapons production

In 1980, Honeywell bought Incoterm Corporation to compete in both the airline reservations system networks and bank teller markets.

==== Honeywell Information Systems ====
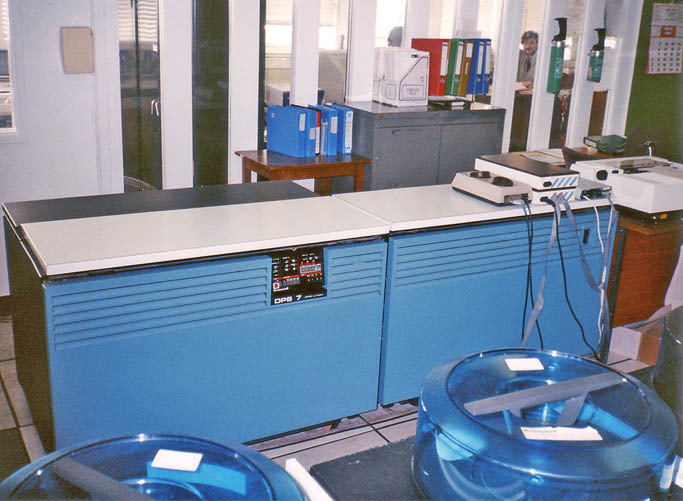
A 1990 Honeywell-Bull Entry Level Mainframe DPS 7 mainframe

In April 1955, Minneapolis-Honeywell started a joint venture with Raytheon called Datamatic to enter the computer market and compete with IBM. In 1957, its first computer, the DATAmatic 1000, was sold and installed. By the release of the DATAmatic 1000, however, Minneapolis-Honeywell bought Raytheon's interest in Datamatic and turned it into the Electronic Data Processing division, later Honeywell Information Systems (HIS) of Minneapolis-Honeywell.

Honeywell purchased minicomputer pioneer Computer Control Corporation (3C's) in 1966, renaming it as Honeywell's Computer Control Division. Through most of the 1960s, Honeywell was one of the "Snow White and the Seven Dwarfs" of computing. IBM was "Snow White", while the dwarfs were the seven significantly smaller computer companies: Burroughs, Control Data Corporation, General Electric, Honeywell, NCR, RCA, and UNIVAC. Later, when their number had been reduced to five, they were known as "The BUNCH", after their initials: Burroughs, UNIVAC, NCR, Control Data Corporation, and Honeywell.

In 1970, Honeywell acquired GE's computer business, rebadging General Electric's 600-series mainframes to Honeywell 6000 series computers, supporting GCOS, Multics, and CP-6, while forming Honeywell Information Systems. In 1973, it shipped a high speed non-impact printer called the Honeywell Page Printing System.

From 1974 to 1987, under the leadership of CEO Edson W. Spencer, the company began a shift away from computers and focused instead on aeronautics and industrial technology. In 1975, it purchased Xerox Data Systems, whose Sigma computers had a small but loyal customer base. Some of Honeywell's systems were minicomputers, such as their Series 60 Model 6 and Model 62 and their Honeywell 200. The latter was an attempt to penetrate the IBM 1401 market. In 1987, HIS merged with Groupe Bull, a global joint venture with Compagnie des Machines Bull of France and NEC Corporation of Japan to become Honeywell Bull. In 1988 Honeywell Bull was consolidated into Groupe Bull and in 1989 renamed to Bull, a Worldwide Information Systems Company. By 1991, Honeywell was no longer involved in the computer business.

=== 1985–1999 integrations ===
==== Aerospace and defense ====
1986 marked a new direction for Honeywell, beginning with the acquisition of the Sperry Aerospace Group from the Unisys Corporation. In 1990, Honeywell spun off its Defense and Marine Systems business into Alliant Techsystems, as well as their Test Instruments division and Signal Analysis Center to streamline the company's focus. Honeywell continues to supply aerospace products including electronic guidance systems, cockpit instrumentation, lighting, and primary propulsion and secondary power turbine engines. In 1996, Honeywell acquired Duracraft and began marketing its products in the home comfort sector.

Honeywell is in the consortium that runs the Pantex Plant that assembles all of the nuclear bombs in the United States arsenal. Honeywell Federal Manufacturing & Technologies, successor to the defense products of AlliedSignal, operates the Kansas City Plant which produces and assembles 85 percent of the non-nuclear components of the bombs.

==== Home and building controls ====
Honeywell began the SmartHouse project, to combine heating, cooling, security, lighting, and appliances into one easily controlled system. They continued the trend in 1987 by releasing new security systems, and fire and radon detectors. In 1992, in another streamlining effort, Honeywell combined its Residential Controls, Commercial Systems, and Protections Services divisions into Home and Building Control, which then acquired the Enviracare air cleaner business. By 1995, Honeywell had condensed into three divisions: Space and Aviation Control, Home and Building Control, and Industrial Control.

==== Industrial control ====
Honeywell dissolved its partnership with Yamatake Company and consolidated its Process Control Products Division, Process Management System Division, and Micro Switch Division into one Industrial Control Group in 1998. It has further acquired Measurex System and Leeds & Northrup to strengthen its portfolio in 1997.

=== 1999–2002 merger, takeovers ===
==== AlliedSignal and Pittway ====
On June 7, 1999, Honeywell was acquired by AlliedSignal, who elected to retain the Honeywell name for its brand recognition. The former Honeywell moved their headquarters of 114 years to AlliedSignal's in Morristown, New Jersey. While "technically, the deal looks more like an acquisition than a merger...from a strategic standpoint, it is a merger of equals." AlliedSignal's 1998 revenue was reported at $15.1 billion to Honeywell's $8.4 billion, but together the companies share huge business interests in aerospace, chemical products, automotive parts, and building controls.

The corporate headquarters were consolidated to AlliedSignal's headquarters in Morristown, New Jersey, rather than Honeywell's former headquarters in Minneapolis, Minnesota. When Honeywell closed its corporate headquarters in Minneapolis, over one thousand employees lost their jobs. A few moved to Morristown or other company locations, but the majority were forced to find new jobs or retire. Soon after the merger, the company's stock fell significantly, and did not return to its pre-merger level until 2007.

In 2000, the new Honeywell acquired Pittway for $2.2 billion to gain a greater share of the fire-protection and security systems market, and merged it into their Home and Building Control division, taking on Pittway's $167 million in debt. Analyst David Jarrett commented that "while Honeywell offered a hefty premium, it's still getting Pittway for a bargain" at $45.50 per share, despite closing at $29 the week before. Pittway's Ademco products complemented Honeywell's existing unified controls systems.

==== General Electric Company ====
In October 2000, Honeywell, then valued at over $21 billion, accepted a takeover bid from then-CEO Jack Welch of General Electric. The American Department of Justice cleared the merger, while "GE teams swooped down on Honeywell" and "GE executives took over budget planning and employee reviews." However, on July 3, 2001, the European Commission's competition commissioner, Mario Monti, blocked the move. This decision was taken on the grounds that with GE's dominance of the large jet engine market, led by the General Electric CF34 turbofan engine, its leasing services (GECAS), and Honeywell's portfolio of regional jet engines and avionics, the new company would be able to "bundle" products and stifle competition through the creation of a horizontal monopoly.

US regulators disagreed, finding that the merger would improve competition and reduce prices; United States Assistant Attorney General Charles James called the EU's decision "antithetical to the goals of antitrust law enforcement." This led to a drop in morale and general tumult throughout Honeywell. The then-CEO Michael Bonsignore was fired as Honeywell looked to turn its business around.

=== 2002–2014 acquisitions and further expansion ===
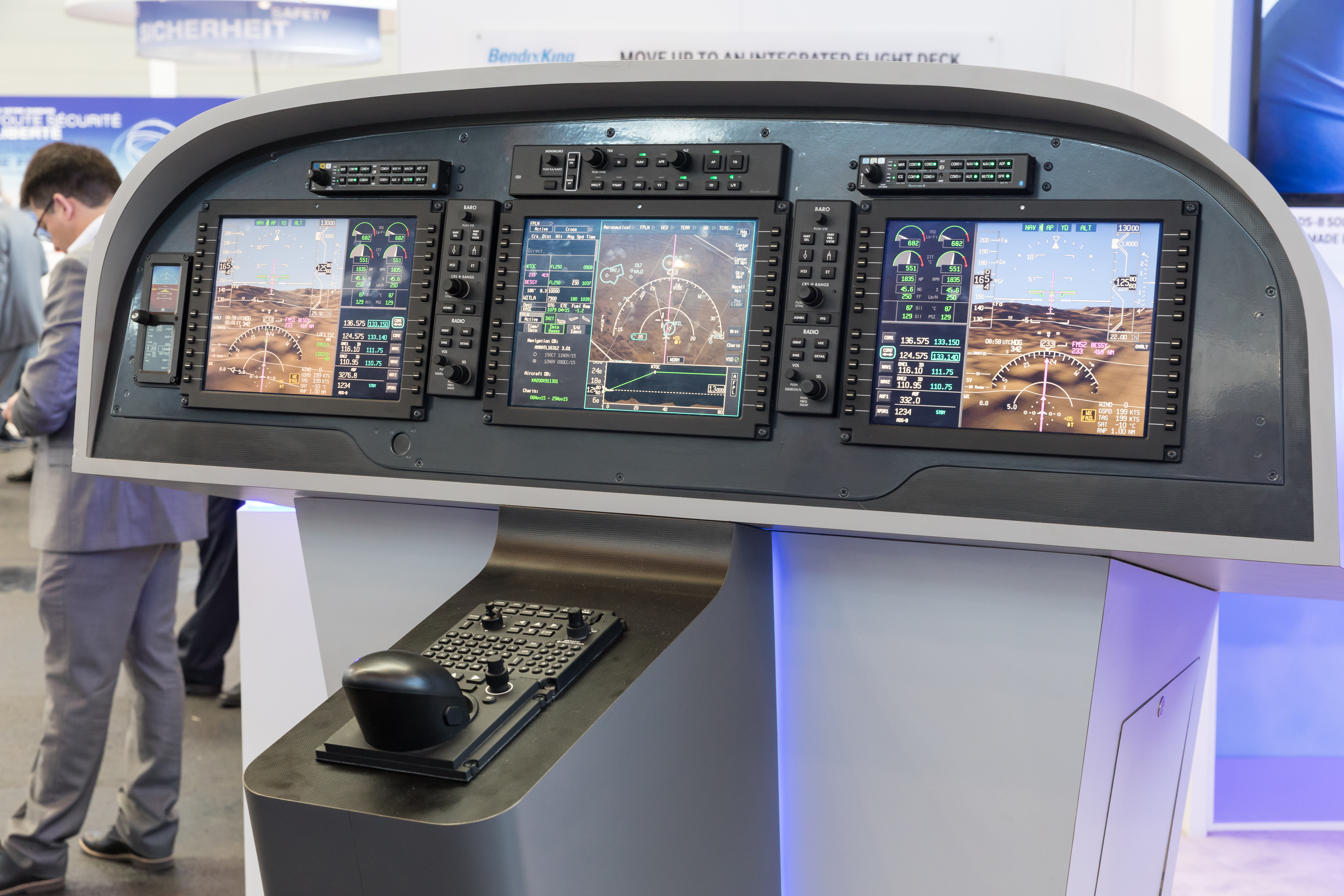
A Honeywell glass cockpit, sold under the brand BendixKing

In January 2002, Knorr-Bremse —who had been operating in a joint venture with Honeywell International Inc. —assumed full ownership of its ventures in Europe, Brazil, and the USA. Bendix Commercial Vehicle Systems became a subsidiary of Knorr-Bremse AG.

In February 2002, Honeywell's board appointed its next CEO and chairman, David M. Cote. Since 2002, Honeywell has made more than 80 acquisitions and 60 divestitures, and increasing its labor force to 131,000 as a result of these acquisitions. Honeywell's stock nearly tripled from $35.23 in April 2002 to $99.39 in January 2015.

Honeywell made a £1.2bn ($2.3bn) bid for Novar plc in December 2004. The acquisition was finalized in March 2005. In October 2005, Honeywell bought out Dow's 50% stake in UOP for $825 million, giving them complete control over the joint venture in petrochemical and refining technology. In May 2010, Honeywell outbid UK-based Cinven and acquired the French company Sperian Protection for $1.4 billion, which was then incorporated into its automation and controls safety unit.

=== 2015–present ===
In 2015, the headquarters were moved to Morris Plains, New Jersey. The headquarters in Morris Plains included a 475,000-square-foot building on 40 acres.

In December 2015, Honeywell acquired Elster for US$5.1B, entering the space of gas, electricity, and water meters with a specific focus on smart meters. Honeywell International Inc. then acquired the 30% stake in UOP Russell LLC it didn't own already for roughly $240 million in January 2016.

In April 2016, Honeywell acquired Xtralis, a provider of aspirating smoke detection, perimeter security technologies, and video analytics software, for $480 million, from funds advised by Pacific Equity Partners and Blum Capital Partners. In May 2016, Honeywell International Inc. settled its patent dispute regarding Google subsidiary Nest Labs, whose thermostats Honeywell claimed infringed on several of its patents. Google parent Alphabet Inc. and Honeywell said it reached a "patent cross-license" agreement that "fully resolves" the long-standing dispute. Honeywell sued Nest Labs in 2012. In 2017, Honeywell opened a new software center in Atlanta, Georgia.

David Cote stepped down as CEO on April 1, 2017, and was succeeded by Darius Adamczyk, who had been promoted to president and chief operating officer (COO) in 2016. Cote served as executive chairman until April 2018. In October 2017, Honeywell announced plans to spin off its Homes, ADI Global Distribution, and Transportation Systems businesses into two separate, publicly traded companies by the end of 2018.

In 2018, Honeywell spun off both Honeywell Turbo Technologies, now Garrett Advancing Motion, and its consumer products business, Resideo. Both companies are publicly traded on the New York Stock Exchange. For the fiscal year 2019, Honeywell reported net income of US$6.230 billion, with an annual revenue of US$36.709 billion, a decrease of 19.11% over the previous fiscal cycle. Honeywell's market capitalization was valued at over US$113.25 billion in September 2020.

Honeywell relocated its corporate headquarters in October 2019 to Charlotte, North Carolina. In July 2019, Honeywell moved employees into a temporary headquarters building in Charlotte before their new building was complete.

In 2020, Honeywell Forge launched as an analytics platform software for industrial and commercial applications such as aircraft, building, industrial, worker and cyber-security. In collaboration with Carnegie Mellon University National Robotics Engineering Center, the Honeywell Robotics was created in Pittsburgh to focus on supply chain transformation. The Honeywell robotic unloader grabs packages in tractor-trailers then places them on conveyor belts for handlers to sort.

In May 2019, GoDirect Trade launched as an online marketplace for surplus aircraft parts such as engines, electronics, and APU parts. In March 2020, Honeywell announced that its quantum computer is based on trapped ions. Its expected quantum volume is at least 64, which Honeywell's CEO called the world's most powerful quantum computer. In November 2021, Honeywell announced the spinoff of its quantum division into a separate company named "Quantinuum".

In March 2023, Honeywell announced Vimal Kapur as its next CEO, effective June 1, 2023. In December 2023, Honeywell agreed to acquire Carrier Global's security business for approximately $5 billion.

In February 2024, Honeywell filed a lawsuit against Lone Star Aerospace, Inc., alleging that their software products infringe on five patents.

On October 1, 2024, Honeywell partnered with Google to integrate data with generative AI with an aim to streamline autonomous operations for its customers.

On October 8, 2024, it was announced that the company's advanced materials division would be spun-off into a new company.

On February 6, 2025, it was announced that Honeywell would be spun-off into three independent companies after activist investor Elliott Investment Management who is in favor of the split took a major stake in the company. With its aerospace, automation, and previously announced advanced materials segments being split into separate companies.

On May 22, 2025, the company announced it was acquiring Johnson Matthey's Catalyst Technologies arm for £1.8 billion.

In October 2025, Honeywell spun of its Advanced Materials business as Solstice Advanced Materials, an independent publicly traded company.

In June 2026, Honeywell completed the spin-off of its Aerospace business, which began trading independently on the Nasdaq under the ticker HONA as Honeywell Aerospace. The remaining company continued as Honeywell Technologies.

In July 2026, Honeywell Technologies completed its acquisition of Johnson Matthey's Catalyst Technologies business for 1.325 billion. The business develops catalysts and process technologies used in areas including chemicals, energy and sustainable fuels.

In late July 2026, Honeywell Technologies completed its sale of its Warehouse and Workflow Solutions business to American Industrial Partners, creating an independent company focused on warehouse automation and material-handling technology.

==== COVID-19 pandemic ====
In response to the COVID-19 pandemic, Honeywell converted some of its manufacturing facilities in Rhode Island, Arizona, Michigan and Germany to produce supplies of personal protective equipment for healthcare workers. In April 2020, Honeywell began production of N95 masks at the company's factories in Smithfield and Phoenix, aiming to produce 20 million masks a month. Honeywell's facilities in Muskegon and Germany were converted to produce hand sanitiser for government agencies.

Several state governments contracted Honeywell to produce N95 particulate-filtering face masks during the pandemic. The North Carolina Task Force for Emergency Repurposing of Manufacturing (TFERM) awarded Honeywell a contract for the monthly delivery of 100,000 N95 masks. In April 2020, Los Angeles Mayor Eric Garcetti announced a deal with Honeywell to produce 24 million N95 masks to distribute to healthcare workers and first responders.

In May 2020, United States President Donald Trump visited the Honeywell Aerospace Technologies facility in Phoenix, where he acknowledged the "incredibly patriotic and hard-working men and women of Honeywell" for making N95 masks and referred to the company's production as a "miraculous achievement".

In April 2021, Will.i.am and Honeywell collaborated on Xupermask, a mask made of silicon and athletic mesh fabric that has LED lights, 3-speed fans and noise-canceling headphones in the mask.

In November 2024, Honeywell announced its intention to sell its personal protective equipment business to Protective Industrial Products for almost $1.33 billion in cash. The sale of this PPE business was completed in May 2025.

After the divestment of PPE business, the company is planning to retain its gas detection portfolio.

== Business groups ==
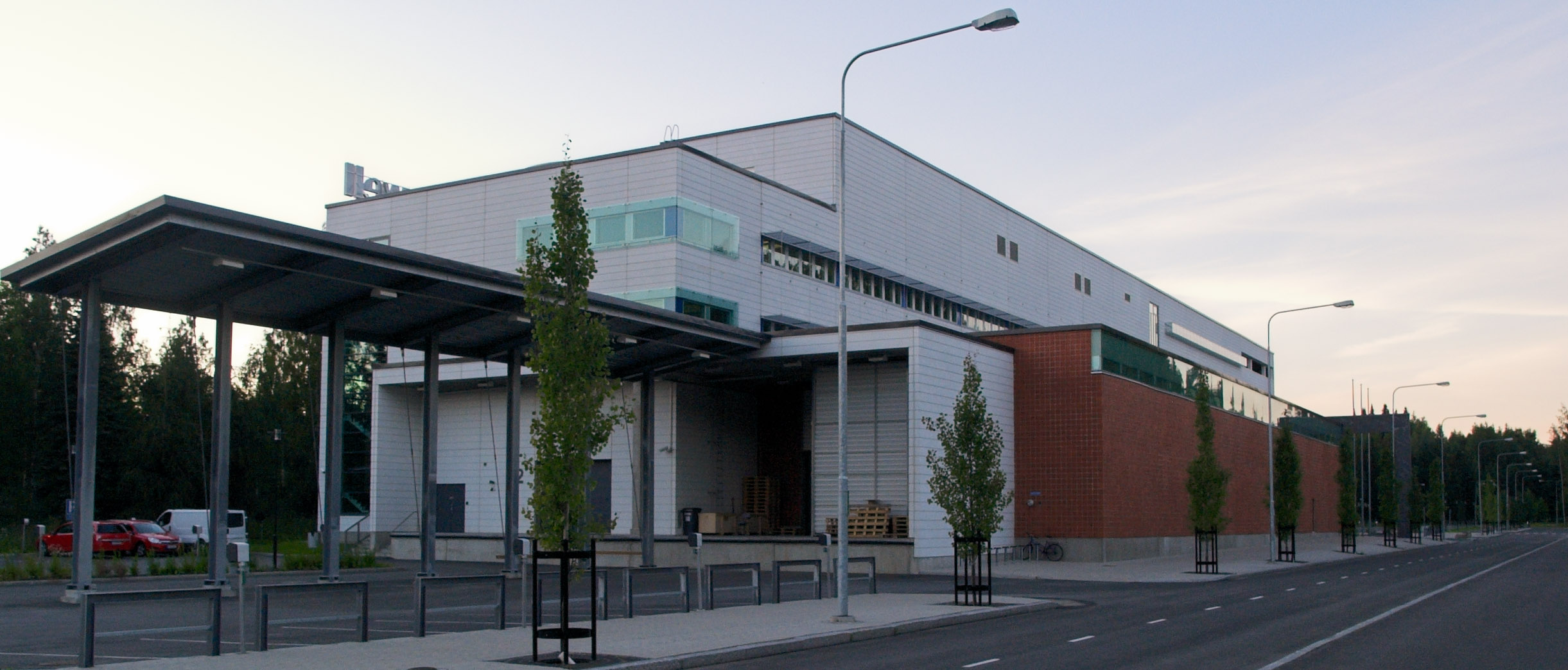
Honeywell House (Innoteknia) in Kuopio Science Park in Kuopio, Finland

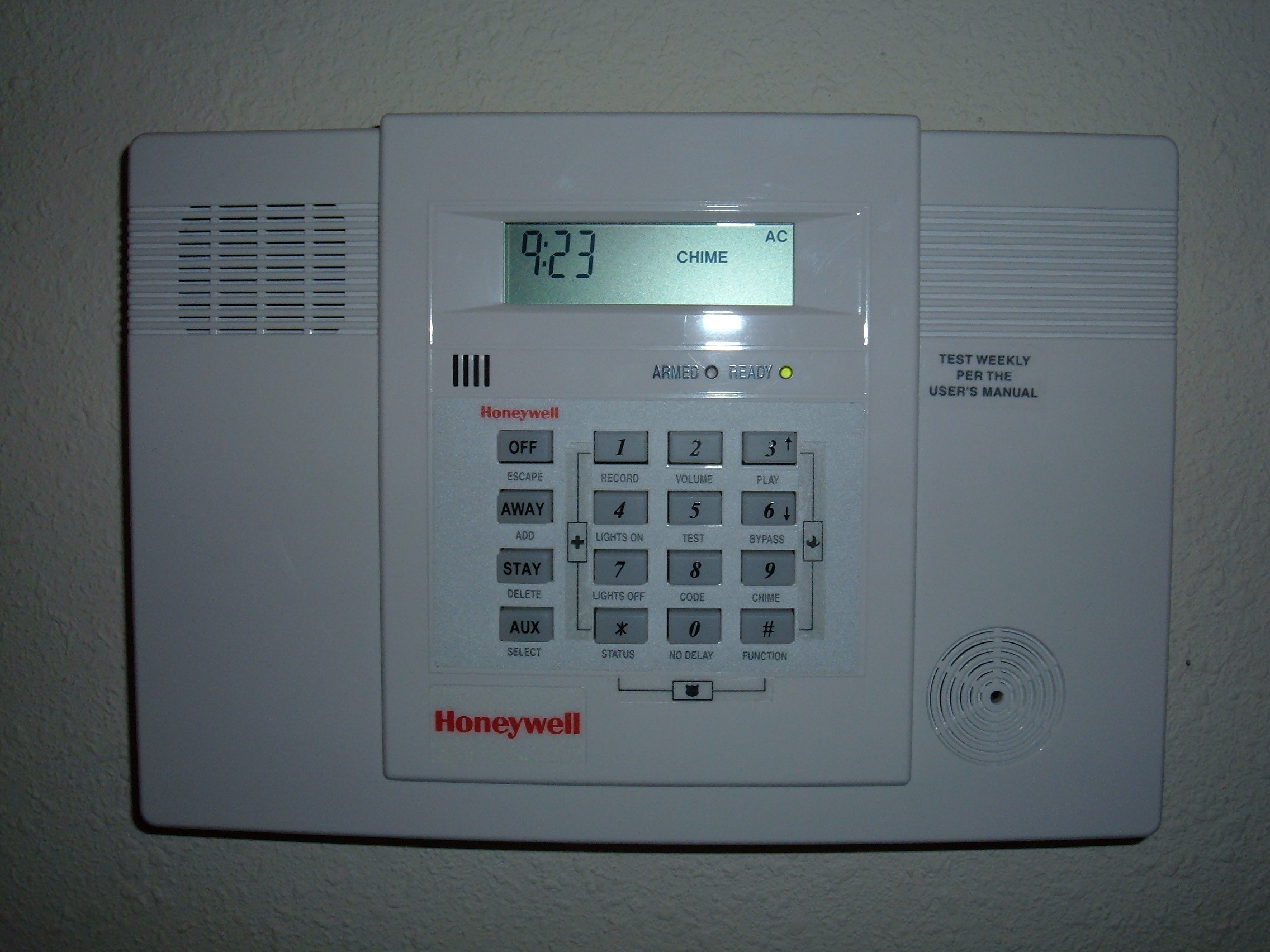
A Honeywell wireless home alarm system control panel

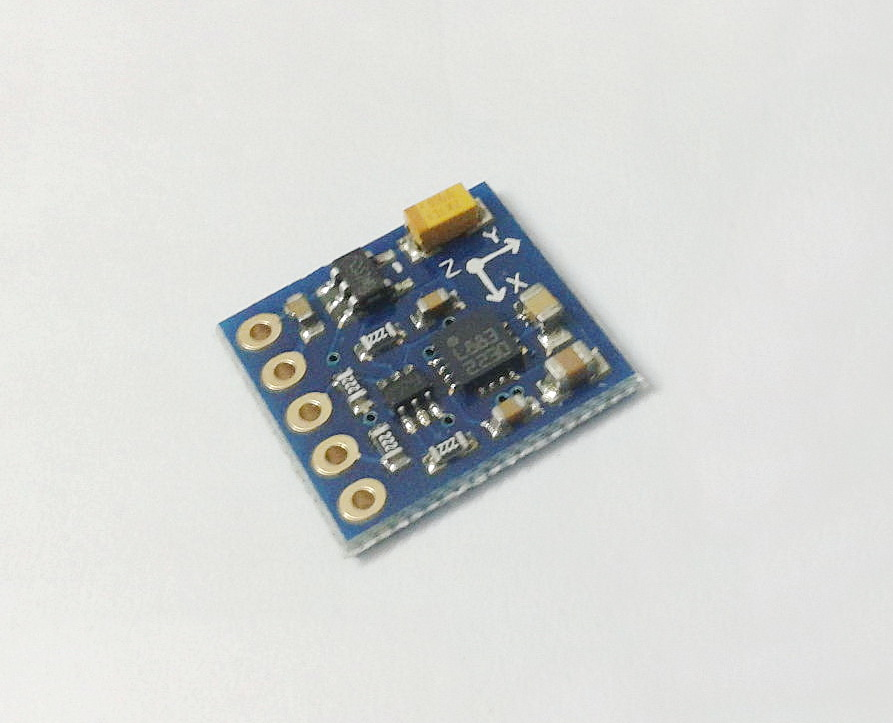
A Honeywell digital compass sensor mounted on a circuit board

The company operates four business groups – Honeywell Aerospace Technologies, Building Automation, Safety and Productivity Solutions (SPS), and Performance Materials and Technologies (PMT). Business units within the company are as follows:

Honeywell Aerospace Technologies provides avionics, aircraft engines, flight management systems, and service solutions to manufacturers, airlines, airport operations, militaries, and space programs. It comprises Commercial Aviation, Defense & Space, and Business & General Aviation. In January 2014, Honeywell Aerospace Technologies launched its SmartPath Precision Landing System at Malaga-Costa del Sol Airport in Spain, which augments GPS signals to make them suitable for precision approach and landing, before broadcasting the data to approaching aircraft. In June 2026, Honeywell Aerospace completed a spin-off into an independent public company.

In July 2014, Honeywell's Transportation Systems merged with the Aerospace division due to similarities between the businesses. In April 2018, Honeywell announced to develop laser communication products for satellite communication in collaboration with Ball Aerospace and plans future volume production. In June 2018 Honeywell spun off and rebranded its Transportation Systems as Garrett.

Building Automation and Honeywell Safety and Productivity Solutions were created when Automation and Control Solutions was split into two in July 2016. Building Automation comprises Honeywell Building Solutions, Environmental and Energy Solutions, and Honeywell Security and Fire. In December 2017, Honeywell announced that it had acquired SCAME, an Italy-based company, to add new fire and gas safety capabilities to its portfolio. Honeywell Safety and Productivity Solutions comprises Scanning & Mobility, Sensing and Internet of Things, and Industrial safety.

Honeywell Performance Materials and Technologies comprises six business units: Honeywell UOP, Honeywell Process Solutions, Fluorine Products, Electronic Materials, Resins & Chemicals, and Specialty Materials. Products include process technology for oil and gas processing, fuels, films and additives, special chemicals, electronic materials, and renewable transport fuels.

== Corporate governance ==
Honeywell's current chief executive officer is Vimal Kapur. As of June 2023, the members of the board are:

| Vimal Kapur | Chief executive officer |
| Vimal Kapur | Chairman |
| Duncan B. Angove | Chief Executive Officer of Arcspring LLC |
| William S. Ayer | Retired chairman of the board and chief executive officer of Alaska Air Group |
| Kevin Burke | Non-executive chairman of Consolidated Edison, Inc. (Con Edison) |
| Deborah Flint | President and chief executive officer of the Greater Toronto Airports Authority (GTAA) |
| D. Scott Davis | Chairman and chief executive officer of United Parcel Service, Inc. (UPS) |
| Rose Lee | President and CEO Cornerstone Buildings Brands |
| Grace D. Lieblein | Vice president of global purchasing and supply chain of General Motors Corporation (GM) |
| Robin L. Washington | Executive vice president and chief financial officer of Gilead Sciences, Inc. |
| Robin Watson CBE | Former chief executive officer of Wood Plc |

== Acquisitions since 2002 ==
Honeywell's acquisitions have consisted largely of businesses aligned with the company's existing technologies. The acquired companies are integrated into one of Honeywell's five business groups (Aerospace Technologies (AT), Building Automation (BA), Safety and Productivity Solutions (SPS), Energy and Sustainability Solutions (ESS), or Performance Materials and Technologies (PMT)) but retain their original brand name.

| Year | Acquisition | Business Group |
|---|---|---|
| 2023 | LenelS2 Supra Onity | BA |
| 2021 | Sparta Systems | PMT |
| 2020 | Sine Group | BA |
| 2020 | Ballard Unmanned Systems | AT |
| 2019 | Tru-Trak Flight Systems | AT |
| 2019 | Rebellion Photonics | SPS |
| 2018 | Transnorm | SPS |
| 2017 | Nextnine | PMT |
| 2017 | SCAME Sistemi | BA |
| 2017 | FLUX (Note: Honeywell acquired a 25% stake in FLUX and a 75% stake in a new joint venture focused outside of China.) | SPS |
| 2016 | Com Dev | AT |
| 2016 | RSI | BA |
| 2016 | Intelligrated | SPS |
| 2016 | Xtralis | BA |
| 2016 | Movilizer | SPS |
| 2016 | UOP Russell LLC | PMT |
| 2015 | Seelze | PMT |
| 2015 | Elster | PMT |
| 2015 | Aviaso | AT |
| 2015 | Datamax-O'Neil | SPS |
| 2013 | Saia Burgess Controls | BA |
| 2013 | Intermec | SPS |
| 2013 | RAE Systems | SPS |
| 2012 | Fire Sentry | BA |
| 2012 | InnCom | BA |
| 2012 | Thomas Russell LLC | PMT |
| 2011 | EMS | SPS/AT |
| 2011 | Iris Systems | BA |
| 2011 | Kings Safety Shoes | SPS |
| 2010 | Akuacom | BA |
| 2010 | Matrikon | PMT |
| 2010 | E-Mon | BA |
| 2010 | Sperian | SPS |
| 2009 | RMG | PMT |
| 2009 | Cythos | SPS |
| 2008 | AV Digital Audio-Videotechnik GmbH | BA |
| 2008 | Energy Services Group, LLC | PMT |
| 2008 | Metrologic | SPS |
| 2008 | IAC | AT |
| 2008 | Callidus | PMT |
| 2008 | Norcross | SPS |
| 2007 | Plant Automation Systems, Inc. (PAS) | PMT |
| 2007 | Dimensions Int'l | AT |
| 2007 | ActiveEye | SPS |
| 2007 | Burtek | PMT |
| 2007 | Ex-Or | BA |
| 2007 | Enraf Holdings B.V. | SPS |
| 2007 | Handheld Products | SPS |
| 2007 | Maxon Corporation | PMT |
| 2006 | Sempra Energy Services | PMT |
| 2006 | First Technology | SPS |
| 2006 | Gardiner Group | BA |
| 2005 | Universal Oil Products (UOP) | PMT |
| 2005 | Novar Controls | BA |
| 2005 | Zellweger | SPS |
| 2005 | Lebow | SPS |
| 2005 | Friedland | BA |
| 2005 | InterCorr International, Inc. | SPS |
| 2005 | Tridium, Inc. | BA |
| 2004 | Hymatic Group | AT |
| 2004 | Genesis Cable | BA |
| 2004 | HomMed, LLC | SPS |
| 2004 | Aube Technologies | BA |
| 2004 | Vindicator | BA |
| 2004 | Electro-Radiation Incorporated (ERI) | AT |
| 2004 | Edgelinx | BA |
| 2004 | GEM Microelectronics | PMT |
| 2003 | Silent Witness | BA |
| 2003 | Sensotec | SPS |
| 2003 | Baker Electronics | AT |
| 2003 | Gamewell | BA |
| 2003 | Olympo | BA |
| 2003 | FutureSmart | BA |
| 2003 | Kolon Films | PMT |
| 2003 | Betatech | BA |
| 2002 | Invensys Sensor Systems | SPS |
| 2002 | Chadwick Helmuth | AT |
| 2002 | Ultrak | BA |
| 2002 | Mora Moravia | AT |
| 2002 | Shanghai Alarm | BA |

== Environmental issues ==
The United States Environmental Protection Agency states that no corporation has been linked to a greater number of Superfund toxic waste sites than Honeywell. In 2007, Honeywell ranked 44th in a list of US corporations most responsible for air pollution, releasing more than 4.25 million kg (9.4 million pounds) of toxins per year into the air. In 2001, Honeywell agreed to pay $150,000 in civil penalties and to perform $772,000 worth of reparations for environmental violations involving:

- failure to prevent or repair leaks of hazardous organic pollutants into the air
- failure to repair or report refrigeration equipment containing chlorofluorocarbons
- inadequate reporting of benzene, ammonia, nitrogen oxide, dichlorodifluoromethane, sulfuric acid, sulfur dioxide, and caprolactam emissions

In 2003, a federal judge in Newark, New Jersey, ordered the company to perform an estimated $400 million environmental remediation of chromium waste, citing "a substantial risk of imminent damage to public health and safety and imminent and severe damage to the environment." In 2003, Honeywell paid $3.6 million to avoid a federal trial regarding its responsibility for trichloroethylene contamination in Lisle, Illinois. In 2004, the State of New York announced that it would require Honeywell to complete an estimated $448 million cleanup of more than 74,000 kg (165,000 lbs) of mercury and other toxic waste dumped into Onondaga Lake in Syracuse, New York, from a former Allied Chemical property.

Honeywell established three water treatment plants by November 2014. The chemicals cleanup site removed 7 tons of mercury. In November 2015, Audubon New York gave the Thomas W. Keesee Jr. Conservation Award to Honeywell for its cleanup efforts in “one of the most ambitious environmental reclamation projects in the United States.” By December 2017, Honeywell completed dredging the lake. Later in December, the Department of Justice filed a settlement requiring Honeywell to pay a separate $9.5 million in damages, as well build 20 restoration projects on the shore to help repair the greater area surrounding the lake.

In 2005, the state of New Jersey sued Honeywell, Occidental Petroleum, and PPG to compel cleanup of more than 100 sites contaminated with chromium, a metal linked to lung cancer, ulcers, and dermatitis. In 2008, the state of Arizona made a settlement with Honeywell to pay a $5 million fine and contribute $1 million to a local air-quality cleanup project, after allegations of breaking water-quality and hazardous-waste laws on hundreds of occasions between 1974 and 2004.

In 2006, Honeywell announced that its decision to stop manufacturing mercury switches had resulted in reductions of more than 11,300 kg (24,900 lb) of mercury, 2,800 kg (6,200 lb) of lead, and 1,500 kg (3,300 lb) of chromic acid use. The largest reduction represents 5% of mercury use in the United States. For this, Honeywell received the EPA's 2006 National Partnership for Environmental Priorities (NPEP) Achievement Award, recognizing Honeywell's leadership in reducing mercury use.

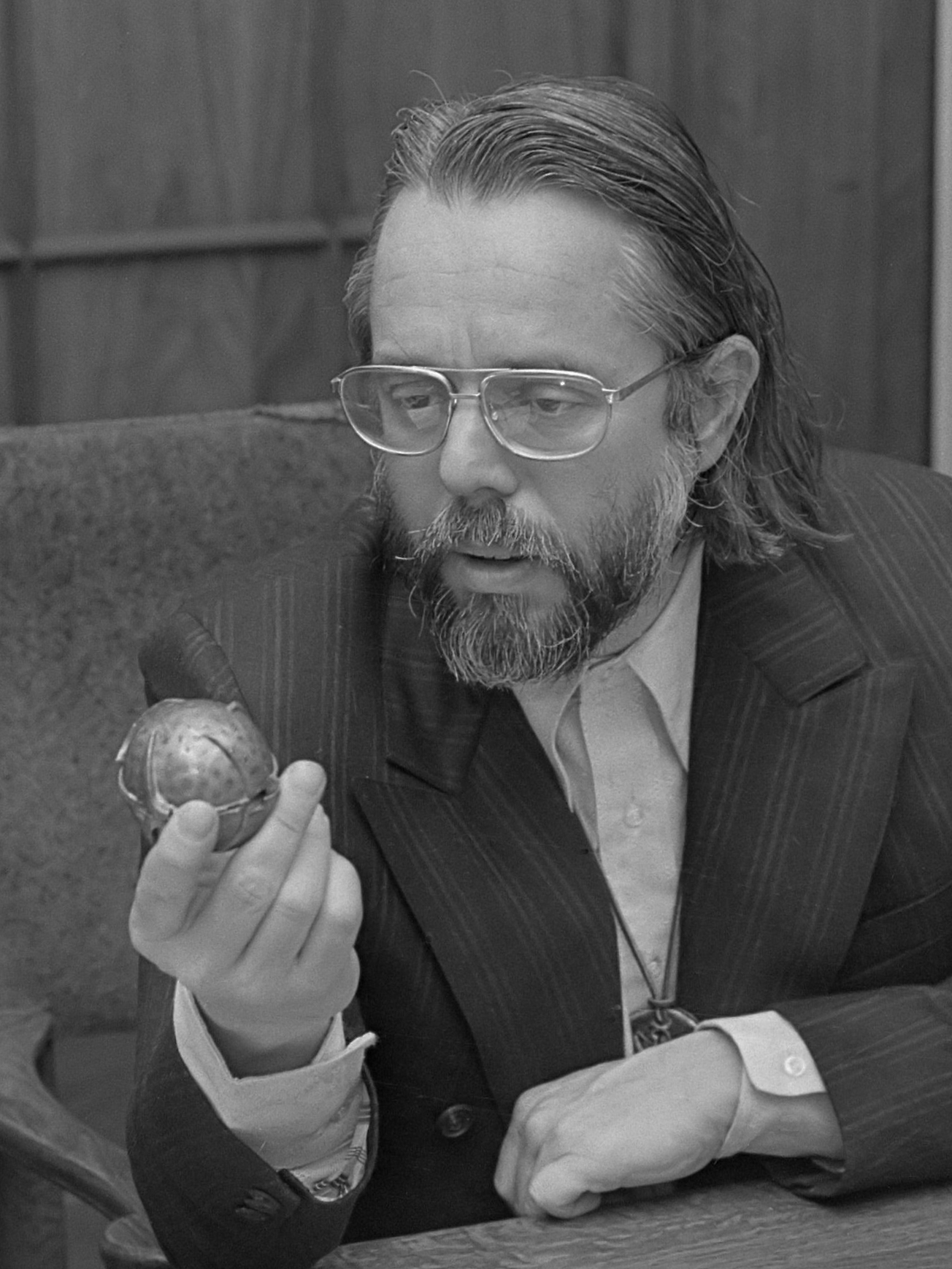
Harvey Cox holding a Honeywell fragmentation bomb, 1973

== Leadership ==
Presidents and chairmen of the company have been:

=== President ===
1. Mark Charles Honeywell, 1927–1934
2. Harold Wilson Sweatt, 1934–1952
3. Paul Barclay Wishart, 1952–1960
4. James Henry Binger, 1960–1965
5. Stephen Flaherty Keating, 1965–1974
6. Edson White Spencer, 1974–1978
7. James Joseph Renier, 1986–1988
8. David Larry Moore, 1993–1997
9. Giannantonio Ferrari, 1997–2000
10. Robert D. Johnson, 1999–2000
11. Darius Adamczyk, 2016–2018
12. Vimal Kapur, 2022–2024

=== Chairman of the Board ===
1. Mark Charles Honeywell, 1934–1954
2. Harold Wilson Sweatt, 1954–1965
3. James Henry Binger, 1965–1975
4. Stephen Flaherty Keating, 1975–1978
5. Edson White Spencer, 1978–1988
6. James Joseph Renier, 1988–1993
7. Michael Robert Bonsignore, 1993–2000
8. Lawrence Arthur Bossidy, 2000–2002
9. David M. Cote, 2002–2018
10. Darius Adamczyk, 2018–2024
11. Vimal Kapur, 2024–present

== See also ==
- List of Honeywell products and services
- Top 100 US Federal Contractors

== Explanatory notes ==
| Preceded by AlliedSignal | Dow Jones Industrial Average component December 2, 1999 – February 9, 2008 | Succeeded by Chevron Corporation |
