= Edson W. Spencer =

American businessman (1926–2012)

- Born: June 4, 1926; Chicago, Illinois
- Died: March 25, 2012 (aged 85); Wayzata, Minnesota
- Education: Williams College (BA '48); Oxford University (BA '50, MA '50)
- Spouse: Harriett McClure Stuart (m. 1950)

Edson White Spencer (June 4, 1926 – March 25, 2012) was an American executive who served as head of Honeywell from 1974 to 1987.

== Early life and education ==
Spencer was born in 1926 in Chicago, Illinois. His father, William Spencer, was chairman of the North American Car Corporation, and his grandfather, F. Edson White, was president of Armour & Company. He served in the U.S. Navy before graduating from Williams College and later studied at Oxford University as a Rhodes Scholar.

== Career ==
Spencer joined Honeywell in 1954 as an aeronautical engineer. He became its chief executive officer in 1974. As chief executive, he oversaw Honeywell's shift away from computers and focused instead on aeronautics and industrial technology. This restructuring included purchasing Sperry Aerospace Group for $1 billion, which expanded Honeywell's aerospace business.

After retiring, Spencer dedicated himself to philanthropy, serving on the boards of the Ford Foundation, Carnegie Endowment for International Peace, Mayo Foundation, and Carleton College. He also served on the U.S.-Japan Business Council and the Trilateral Commission. He and his wife, Harriet, co-founded the Yellowstone Park Foundation and contributed to projects within Yellowstone National Park.
