= Vimal Kapur =

Indian-American business executive

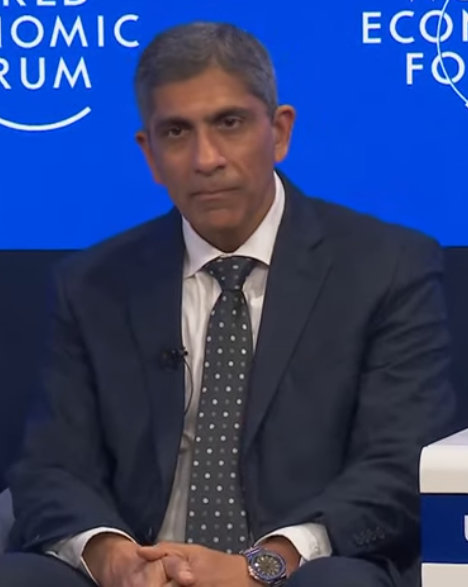
- At the WEF Annual Meeting in 2025
- Born: 1965 (age 60–61); India
- Education: Thapar Institute of Engineering and Technology
- Title: CEO of Honeywell
- Term: June 2023 – present
- Predecessor: Darius Adamczyk

Vimal Kapur (born 1965) is an Indian-American business executive and CEO of the American multinational conglomerate Honeywell as of June 2023.

== Early life ==
Vimal Kapur was born in India in 1965. He attended the Thapar Institute of Engineering in Patiala and graduated as an electronics engineer with a specialization in instrumentation in 1986.

== Career ==
Kapur began his career at a Honeywell JV in 1989. He worked his way through the company and was eventually named Managing Director of Honeywell Automation India Ltd. (HAIL) in 2006. He held that position for four years. Then, in 2010, he became VP of Global Marketing and Strategy for Honeywell Process Solutions, and VP and General Manager of Honeywell Process Solutions Advanced Solutions.

In 2014, Kapur was named President of Honeywell Process Solutions (HPS), where he steered the company through the oil and gas downturn. He held that position until 2018, when he was promoted to President and CEO of Honeywell Building Technologies (HBT) in Atlanta, Georgia.

In 2021, Kapur moved to Houston, Texas and took on the role of President and CEO of Honeywell Performance Materials & Technologies (PMT).

In July 2022, Kapur was named as president and chief operating officer (COO) of Honeywell.

In March 2023, Honeywell announced that Kapur had been appointed to the board of directors, and that he would replace Darius Adamczyk as CEO of the company effective June 1, 2023.

== See also ==
- List of chief executive officers
