= James H. Binger =

American lawyer

- Born: May 16, 1916; St. Paul, Minnesota
- Died: November 3, 2004 (aged 88); Minneapolis
- Education: Yale University (AB '38); University of Minnesota (LLB '41)
- Spouse: Virginia Edith McKnight (m. 1939)

James Henry Binger (May 16, 1916 – November 3, 2004) was an American lawyer who became Chairman and Chief Executive Officer of Honeywell. He was also a horse enthusiast and New York City and Minneapolis theatre owner and entrepreneur.

== Career ==
The son of a doctor, Binger grew up on Summit Avenue in St. Paul, Minnesota. He attended Saint Paul Academy, where he met his wife Virginia McKnight, daughter of 3M Chairman William L. McKnight. He earned an economics degree from Yale University (class of 1938), where his lifelong interest in the theatre was sparked. He next earned a law degree from the University of Minnesota Law School and upon graduation joined Minneapolis law firm Dorsey & Whitney, where Honeywell was a client.

Binger joined Honeywell in 1943 and became its president in 1961 and its chairman in 1965. On becoming Chairman, he revamped the company sales approach, placing emphasis on profits rather than volume. He increased the company's international expansion, and changed the company's name from Minneapolis-Honeywell Regulator Co to Honeywell.

Under Binger's stewardship from 1961 to 1978, the company expanded into such fields as defense, aerospace, computers and cameras. Honeywell was one of the eight major computer companies (with IBM — the largest — Burroughs, Scientific Data Systems, Control Data Corporation, General Electric, RCA and UNIVAC) through most of the 1960s. In 1970, Honeywell bought General Electric's computer division.

== Outside Honeywell ==
Binger was a world traveler who had financial interests in the Minnesota Vikings, Butler Square in downtown Minneapolis and several hundred acres of land, including a polo field in western Hennepin County, Minnesota.

=== Tartan Farms ===
Binger was a horse man who played polo on weekends. He and Virginia took over operations of her father's Tartan Farms in Ocala, Florida, in 1974, and became its owners when Virginia's father died in 1978. During their stewardship, Tartan Farm bred 1980 Preakness Stakes winner Codex and 1990 three-year-old champion and Kentucky Derby winner Unbridled. The Bingers also bred and owned 1978 champion sprinter Dr. Patches, a son of McKnight's horse Dr. Fager. Tartan dispersed the majority of its horses at the 1987 Fasig-Tipton Kentucky November sale, including Unbridled, who sold as a weanling for $70,000.

Binger served as chairman of Calder Race Course in Miami from the late 1970s through the '80s. He received recognition for his contributions to horse racing and was the Thoroughbred Retirement Foundation Champion Award recipient in 2000. Tartan Farm is now under new ownership, and known as Winding Oaks Farm.

=== Theatre ===
Virginia had a love of theatre, and when her father wanted to sell his two theatres, Binger stepped in to assist. He found the business fascinating, and after paying the gift tax and selling the Colonial Theatre in Boston, he and Virginia retained the St. James Theatre on Broadway and agreed to expand the operation. Jujamcyn Amusement Corporation, named after their children (JUdith, JAMes, and CYNthia), expanded to five theatres, becoming the third-largest company on Broadway behind the Shubert Organization and the Nederlander Organization. Their theatres are: (1) the St. James Theatre (acquired 1970), (2) Al Hirschfeld Theatre, (3) Eugene O'Neill Theatre (acquired 1982), (4) the Walter Kerr Theatre, and (5) the Virginia (acquired 1981), now the August Wilson Theatre:

- Virginia Theatre – this 1,275-seat theatre was designed by Crane, Franzheim & Bettis as the home of the Theatre Guild in 1925. President Calvin Coolidge officially inaugurated the theatre by flipping a switch for electricity in Washington, D.C. The theatre was leased in 1943 as a radio station. The American National Theater and Academy (ANTA) purchased the theatre in 1950 and renamed it the ANTA Theatre. Previously called the ANTA Theatre, in 1981 the theatre was renamed the Virginia in honour of Virginia Binger. It was renamed by new owner Rocco Landesman in October 2005, in honor of playwright August Wilson.

Jujamcyn owned only five of the 40 Broadway district playhouses, but created a much-envied business model that has accounted for as much as one-third of Broadway's gross revenues. One box office juggernaut was the musical The Producers, which won a record 12 Tony Awards in 2001.

Binger was a life member of the board of the Guthrie Theater in Minneapolis. He was also a director of the Vivian Beaumont Theater in New York and a member of the executive committee of the League of American Theaters (now the Broadway League, co-presenters of the Tony Awards). On the announcement of Binger's death in 2004, The League of American Theatres and Producers announced that Broadway's marquees would be dimmed at 8 PM on November 4 in tribute.

Landesman then announced that he planned to buy Jujamcyn Theatres, telling the New York Times that he had a long-standing understanding with Binger that he would buy Jujamcyn's five playhouses. The theatres had an estimated net asset value of about $30 million.

=== Philanthropist ===
Binger was a leading member of his father-in-law's McKnight foundation, and set up his own Foundation on his death. He also made various other direct philanthropic donations, including:

- Yale University – probably the law school's biggest individual benefactor, he was recognized as a $1 million giver by 1987 and had continued contributions until his death.
- Minneapolis Theatre – Binger was a quiet champion of theater, often bailing out struggling organizations and building up the flagship institutions like the Guthrie Theater. In the early 1980s, Binger and Leland Lynch provided the money to bring shows to the decrepit Orpheum Theatre.
- McKnight Foundation – Binger promoted grants for the arts, international-dispute resolution and research into neuroscience. Virginia Binger's parents established the McKnight Foundation in 1953 as a private philanthropic organization. Virginia served as president of the Foundation from 1974 to 1987. During her presidency the organization gave away some $235 million, and its assets grew from less than $8 million to almost $800 million.
- Robina Foundation — made a gift of $2.85 million to the Yale School of Drama / Yale Repertory Theatre to support the development and production of new plays. The Robina Foundation supports transformational projects at four institutional partners named by Binger: Abbott Northwestern Hospital, The Council on Foreign Relations, the University of Minnesota Law School, and Yale University.

== Personal life ==
Having dated since high school, Binger and Virginia McKnight married on June 24, 1939, slightly less than three months before her 23rd birthday. They were married for over 60 years and had three children: James (Mac), Cynthia and Judith (died 1989). The couple lived in St. Paul, Minnesota, and Ardmore, Pennsylvania, before returning to the Twin Cities, settling in Wayzata, Minnesota. On her father's death, Virginia McKnight Binger became Minneapolis's richest woman. She died on December 22, 2002. After Virginia's death, Binger sold the house they had shared and moved to downtown Minneapolis.

Jane K. Mauer was president of the Tartan Investment Company, which handled Binger's financial affairs. When Binger moved downtown, he became close to Mauer and they eventually became a couple. But as his colon cancer progressed, his mental state deteriorated. The Binger family took court action to prevent their father from making what they considered bad decisions, and specifically from endangering the McKnight Trust.

=== Death ===
Binger died of colon cancer on November 3, 2004. In December 2005, Minnesota state announced a surplus, including a death duties tax payment of $112M. It was announced that this was the largest estate tax payment state officials could recall. Minnesota Revenue Department's estate tax supervisor Greg Hoyt summed up his reaction as "WOW!" Binger's granddaughter Noa Staryk later confirmed it was from Binger's estate and that they were pursuing court action to recover $200M bequeathed to Jane K. Mauer in a late will change. A tax expert estimated that there would have been a similar payment to federal tax authorities, and estimated the size of the estate at $900M, even before including the Robina Trust fund of $200M.

The latest theory as to why so much tax was due is similar to the case involving Anna Nicole Smith: property investment, and transfer of these assets to surviving family members.

== Trivia ==
- Binger was part of a consortium that took control of the Minnesota Vikings American football team in 1991. In 1998, the NFL approved Red McCombs's bid to become the team's sole owner.
- Binger supported the Republican Party.
