= W. R. Sweatt =

American industrialist (1866–1937)

W.R. Sweatt
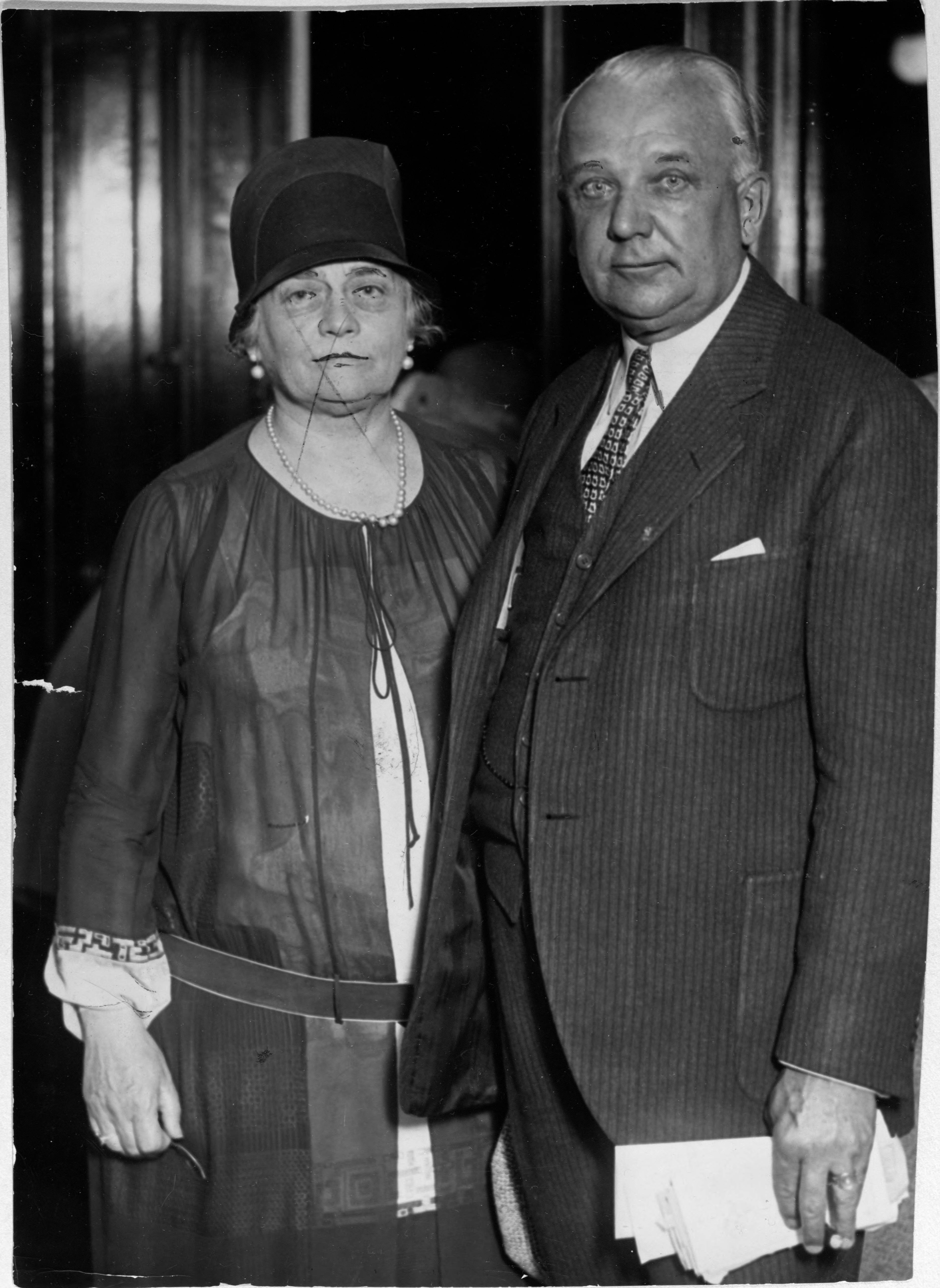
- Mr. and Mrs. William R. Sweatt (1928)
- Born: March 1866; Mitchell, Iowa, U.S.
- Died: 12 October 1937 (aged 71); Minneapolis, Minnesota, U.S.
- Resting place: Lakewood Cemetery
- Occupation: Businessman

William Richard Sweatt (March 1866 – October 12, 1937) was an American industrialist.

== Early life ==
William Sweatt was the son of Charles Sweatt, a Vermont banker and hardware merchant. Charles sought greater opportunities in the West, hence the family moved to Iowa.

== Arrival in Minnesota ==
William R. Sweatt arrived in Minneapolis in 1891. He started the Sweatt Manufacturing Company, building wooden wheelbarrows, grocery boxes, and wooden washing machines at a factory in Robbinsdale, Minnesota.

In 1892, at the urging of his father-in-law, W.R. Sweatt invested $5,300 in the Consolidated Temperature Control Company, based in Minneapolis. A year later, the board of directors asked him to take over management of the company.

== Electric Heat Regulator Company ==
In 1888, Albert Butz's attorneys renamed Butz Thermo-Electric Company to the Consolidated Temperature Controlling Company.

Early in the year 1892, the management of the Consolidated Temperature Controlling Company renamed the company the Electric Thermostat Company.

On August 16, 1892, the stockholders of the Electric Thermostat Company agreed to sell an extensive list of patents to W.R. Sweatt for the sum of $1.00.

On October 5, 1892, the directors changed the name to the Electric Heat Regulator Company and recapitalized it and elected W.R. Sweatt as both Secretary and Treasurer. The stockholders agreed to accept the assets of the Electric Thermostat Company and to assume the liabilities of Sweatt as a trustee.

By 1895, the company showed a profit for the first time.

In 1896, W.R. Sweatt was given a salary of $1200.00 for the year and a retroactive salary of $1200.00 for the year 1895.

At a stockholder meeting February 23, 1898, W.R. Sweatt purchased the entire company from the other stockholders. By 1900, Sweatt held all 400 shares of stock, and by 1902 he had paid off the company's outstanding debts.

Sweatt sold Sweatt Manufacturing Company in 1901 to Arthur O Hubbard and his brother in law Herbert M Puffer, forming the Puffer Hubbard Manufacturing Co on January 26, 1901.

From the time he began managing Electric Heat Regulator Co. in 1893, it never suffered a losing financial year.

From around 1905 all advertising had introduced the country to the heat regulator called The Minneapolis.

Early thermostats were stamped Electric Heat Regulator Co.. By 1910 the thermostats were actually stamped “The Minneapolis” in bold face across the cover.

Around 1908, W.R. Sweatt and factory supervisor Joel Hersleter began experiments on a new product to further refine the automatic damper-flapper control. The idea was simple:
i) Modify am alarm clock,
ii) Adapt an alarming mechanism in such a way that, instead of ringing a bell, it mechanically changed the setting on the thermostat.
iii) Through a clever arrangement of levers and catches, the clock would be mounted on directly on the thermostat.
iv) The "alarm" could be set to go off, say at 8 o'clock, and when 8 o'clock arrived, the device would turn the thermostat up automatically.
v) The clock thermostat idea was around for some time, so it was natural for Sweatt and Kersteter to develop the new product.

By 1910, Electric Heating Regulator Company employed 12 men. Two types of motors were assembled: the original spring wound motor, which required periodical winding, and a newer gravity type motor, which used an iron weight for power. In addition to the motors, the company assembled thermostats from parts purchased from the Standard Thermostat Company of Boston.

== The Minneapolis Heat Regulator Company ==
In 1912 the company was renamed The Minneapolis Heat Regulator Company.

In 1913, W.R. Sweatt named his 22-year-old son, Harold, vice-president of his heat regulator company.

In 1920, W.R. announced that his second son, Charles "C.B." Sweatt would be the advertising manager and treasurer of the Minneapolis Heat Regulator Co. At this time, there were 250 employees in the home office and factory with 100 more in sales and distribution throughout the country. By 1926, there were branch offices in 9 cities, complemented by 15 authorized distributors. The control system ranged in cost from $60 to $180, which might include a clock thermostat, a limit control (which provided a safety valve to prevent accidental overheating) and a damper motor.

The Company's products were starting to cross international borders: such as the diamond mines of South Africa and the Chinese National Museum. In 1938, a letter from London reported news of royal significance "...the King of England sleeps in comfort at his Balmoral Castle, his Scottish residence."

For 35 years, W.R. Sweatt and his company developed and sold his damper-flapper for hand fired coal furnaces. But by the twenties, oil and gas became viable options as technology made their use more practical. In 1927, Minneapolis Heat Regulator and Honeywell merged.

== Mark Honeywell ==
Honeywell Heating Specialty Company was established in 1906 at Wabash, Indiana by Mark C. Honeywell, and manufactured water-heating equipment. The firm was reorganized and its name changed to Honeywell Heating Specialties Company in 1916, and it began to produce automatic temperature controls.

By 1927, company sales were more than $1.5 million and 450 people worked in the Wabash factory.

Mr. Honeywell's competitor was W.R. Sweatt and his Minneapolis Heat Regulator Company.

== Minneapolis Honeywell Regulator Company ==
In 1927 the Minneapolis Heat Regulator Company, then a manufacturer of automatic controls for coal-fired furnaces, and Honeywell Heating Specialties Company, a manufacturer of oil burner controls, merged to form the Minneapolis-Honeywell Regulator Company. The two companies had patents which blocked each other from further growth.

The headquarters of the new firm was established in Minneapolis, with W.R. Sweatt chairman of the board and Mark C. Honeywell president. Manufacturing was continued in both Minneapolis and Wabash.

== Continued growth ==
In 1934 the product range for industrial applications is substantially increased by the acquisition of the Brown Instruments Company which had been established in Philadelphia in 1859. Brown Instruments produced display and writing control units for industrial processes. The Brown Instruments Company also operated internationally.

== Honeywell ==
The corporate name was changed in 1964 to Honeywell Inc.

== Personal life ==
Sweatt married Jessie W. Wilson in 1888. They had four children, Harold W., Charles B., Mrs. Strong and Mrs. A. C. Potter.

Sweatt died on October 12, 1937, at the home of his daughter in Minneapolis. He was buried in Lakewood Cemetery.

== Sweatt Legacy ==
Between W. R. Sweatt and his son Harold, they would provide 75 years of uninterrupted leadership for the company. It was W.R. Sweatt who survived a couple of rough spots and turned an innovative idea - thermostatic heating control - into a thriving business. Harold, who took over in 1934, led Honeywell through a significant period of growth and global expansion that set the stage for Honeywell to become a global technology leader.
