= Energy information management =

Energy management equipment

Traditionally energy management equipment is associated with building automation (BAS) or building management systems (BMS). IT firms have developed such architecture.

Energy management systems generate huge amounts of data about a building, from outside and inside air temperature, to carbon monoxide and humidity levels, each associated with the time of day, week, and year. These systems allow you to see what is going on in the building and to set complex schedules to control light and temperature based on the current information and instructions. They usually produce a record of energy use, but generally do not aggregate the data or allow you to see trends over time and location.

Energy information management offers solutions to automate the data available from a BMS, BAS or EMS, aggregate it and apply algorithms to extract actionable information from the data. This allows the building owner a method for the ongoing, continuous improvement of a building’s energy use over time.

== See also ==
- Energy conservation
- Energy law
- LEED
