= Michael Bonsignore =

American businessman

- Born: April 3, 1941 (age 85); Plattsburg, New York
- Education: United States Naval Academy (BSc '63)
- Spouse: Sheila Ani Gorman (m. 1963)
- Military career
- Branch: United States Navy
- Service years: 1959–69
- Rank: Lieutenant

Michael Robert Bonsignore (born April 3, 1941) is an American businessman. He is the former chairman and chief executive officer of Honeywell. In 2004, he was elected to the National Geographic Society board of trustees. He is the owner of a Stonington Gallery in Seattle, which showcases contemporary works by artists in the Pacific Northwest and Alaska working in indigenous traditions.

== Career ==
Bonsignore graduated from the United States Naval Academy with a degree in electrical engineering in 1963, and subsequently graduated from Texas A&M University in 1969. He joined Honeywell in 1969 with the Aerospace group. He was named president of Honeywell Europe in 1982, executive vice president in 1987, and chief operating officer in 1990. Finally, Bonsignore was named chairman and chief executive officer in 1993.

Bonsignore is a collector of Northwest coast art. He owns Stonington Gallery in Seattle, Washington, which was formerly owned by artist Nancy Stonington. Stonington Gallery features contemporary works by artists in the Pacific Northwest and Alaska.
