= Novar Controls =

Manufacturing company

Novar / Novar Controls
- Company type: Subsidiary
- Headquarters: Cleveland, Ohio, United States
- Products: Energy Management System, energy services, Building automation, Thermostats, Programmable thermostat, Energy Information Management
- Number of employees: 116,000 industry = Building automation, HVAC, Intelligent building, Chain stores, Energy management, Lighting, Refrigeration, Building Control
- Parent: Honeywell International
- Website: www.novar.com

Novar (also Novar Controls) is a manufacturing company based in Cleveland, Ohio, United States, which develops technology to centrally control and manage HVAC, refrigeration and lighting systems for businesses, using direct digital control and energy management. More than 40,000 sites worldwide use Novar technology, and more than 10,000 of those sites are actively managed by Novar.

Novar was founded in 1964 by James Ott, an Ohio State University graduate, and acquired by Honeywell International in 2005.
