= Wagtail (missile) =

- Type: Air-to-surface missile
- Place of origin: United States

Service history
- Used by: United States Air Force

Production history
- Designed: 1956–1961
- Manufacturer: Minneapolis-Honeywell

Specifications
- Length: 5.6 feet (1.7 m)
- Diameter: 12 inches (300 mm)
- Engine: Dual-thrust rocket Boost phase: 9,900 lb_{f} (44 kN); Terminal phase: 2,500 lb_{f} (11 kN)
- Propellant: Solid fuel
- Launch platform: B-58 Hustler

The Wagtail missile, also known as "Wag Tail", was a short-range nuclear missile developed in the late 1950s by Minneapolis-Honeywell under a contract awarded by the United States Air Force. Intended for use as an auxiliary weapon by bomber aircraft, the missile was successfully test fired in 1958, but the program was cancelled in the early 1960s.

== Design and development ==
The Wagtail project was initiated in 1956, with Minneapolis-Honeywell being contracted to develop a short-range, solid-rocket-powered missile. The missile would be armed with a low-yield nuclear warhead, and was intended for use as a tactical support missile by supersonic aircraft engaged in low-level attacks.

The Wagtail missile was intended to be fitted with a guidance system that utilised an inertial navigation system and a terrain-following radar, which allowed the missile to be fired from and navigate at extremely low altitudes. The missile was equipped with small retrorockets that retarded the missile following release, allowing the launching aircraft the opportunity to escape the blast wave from the missile's warhead.

== Operational history ==
By 1958, the Wagtail project had progressed to the point of live-fire flight testing; the missile was planned to be fitted to the B-58 Hustler bomber in operational service, while an alternative configuration was proposed as a bomber defense missile, which would be fired rearwards from the carrier aircraft. However, in the early 1960s (prior to fiscal year 1962), despite the missiles' flight testing having proved successful, the Wagtail project was canceled.

== See also ==
- AGM-69 SRAM
- Pye Wacket
