= Honeywell auxiliary power unit =

Aircraft auxiliary power unit made by Honeywell

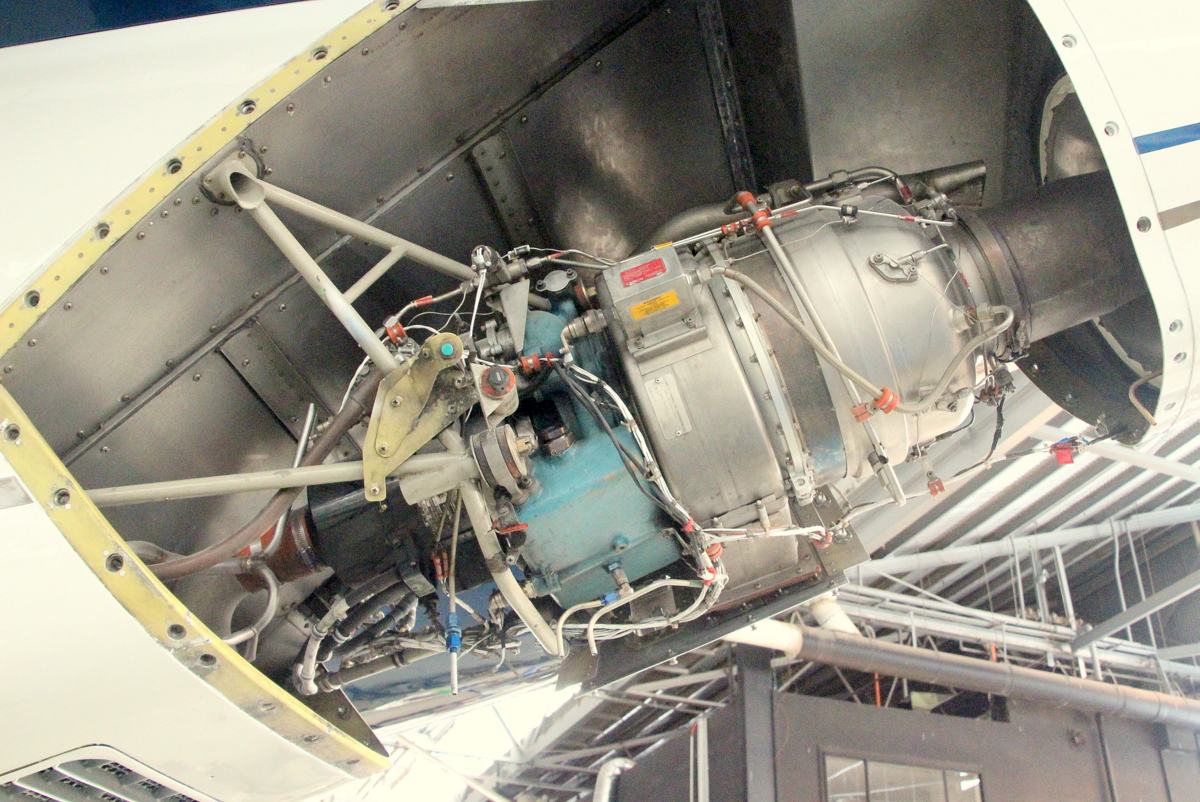
A Honeywell GTCP36-150(CX) auxiliary power unit mounted in the tail of a Cessna Model 750 Citation X

Honeywell auxiliary power units are a series of gas turbine auxiliary power units (APU) made by Honeywell Aerospace. Honeywell started manufacturing APUs in the early 1950s and since then they can be found on many aircraft. Over the years Honeywell have produced more than 95,000 APUs and more than 36,000 are still in service.

In 2018 Honeywell had a 65% share of the airliner APU market and is the sole supplier for the Airbus A350, the Boeing 777 and single-aisle airliners: the Boeing 737 MAX, Airbus A220 (formerly Bombardier CSeries), Comac C919, Irkut MC-21 and Airbus A320neo after Airbus removed the Hamilton Sundstrand APS3200 option. Pratt & Whitney Canada (P&WC) claims the remaining 35% of the APU market with the Airbus A380, Boeing 787 and Boeing 747-8.

== Variants ==
=== 131 Series ===
The 131-9D initially was designed for the McDonnell Douglas MD-90 series; the 131-9B became standard equipment on Boeing 737NG; the 131-9A on the Airbus A320 family. The 131-9C has entered service aboard the Airbus A220 (formerly Bombardier C-Series). The 131 Series uses a two-stage axial turbine and a single generator which starts the APU.

=== 331 Series ===
The 331 series are found on many wide-body Boeing and Airbus aircraft and the Honeywell 331-200 introduced several new technologies such as digital electronic control and the eductor for oil cooling, which eliminated the need for cooling fans. The development of a turboprop derivative from the Honeywell TPE331 also reduced development time and production costs. Its applications include Airbus A220 -100 and -300 series, A300, A330, A340, Boeing 767 and 777, Bombardier CRJ700/900/100, Comac C919 and Irkut MC-21.

== See also ==
- Auxiliary power unit
- Pratt & Whitney Canada
