= Daikin Applied Americas =

HVAC company

- Formerly: McQuay International
- Type: Subsidiary
- Industry: HVAC manufacturing
- Predecessor: McQuay Radiator
- Founded: 1933; 93 years ago in Minneapolis, United States; acquired by Daikin 2006
- Founder: Roy Jay Resch
- Headquarters: Minneapolis, Minnesota, United States
- Key people: Yu Nishiwaki (CEO)(2026)
- Revenue: $581.8 million
- Number of employees: 4156
- Parent: Daikin
- Website: daikinapplied.com

Daikin Applied Americas (formerly McQuay International) is a corporation that designs, manufacturers and sells heating, ventilation, and air conditioning (HVAC) products, systems, parts and services for commercial buildings. Since 2006, McQuay has been a subsidiary of Daikin Industries, Ltd. McQuay world headquarters are located in Minneapolis, Minnesota, United States. Products are sold by a global network of sales representatives and distributors.

== History ==
Formerly McQuay Radiator, McQuay was incorporated in 1933 with manufacturing and headquarters in Minneapolis, Minnesota. Initial success was built on the first classroom unit ventilator and the first hermetic compressor for air conditioning use. McQuay's President, from 1933 until his death in June of 1957, was Roy Jay Resch, originally of Cleveland, Ohio.

During 1941 to 1945, McQuay manufacturing facilities were converted to support the U.S. war effort. McQuay designed and manufactured self-sealing fuel tanks and extended bomb release shackles for the Doolittle Tokyo Raider's B-25s. In the later 1940s and 1950s, McQuay products and sales grew as the demand for commercial air conditioning increased. The U.S. manufacturing facilities were expanded to meet this demand. McQuay quickly became the world's largest supplier of heat transfer coils.

McQuay became a multi-national corporation during the 1960s by beginning overseas sales and licensing operations in Canada, England, Scotland, and Australia. In 1965, McQuay established a new division in Italy near Anzio, McQuay Europa, to manufacture 50 Hz equipment.

A McQuay subsidiary, American Automatic Ice Machine Company, was a leader in that field. Their ice product was known as "Crystal Tips".

Through mergers and acquisition in the 1970s, 1980s, and 1990s, the McQuay product line grew to include more types of commercial HVAC and large capacity equipment, as air conditioning became viewed more as a requirement than a luxury in buildings of all types. In 1984 it was acquired by Snyder General in what was a hostile takeover. Much of the companies assets were sold off.

In 1992 McQuay, received the Stratospheric Ozone Protection Award from the U.S. Environmental Protection Agency in recognition of McQuay being the first to design and manufacture chillers with HFC-134a, a refrigerant with no ozone depletion potential.

In 2006, McQuay was acquired by Daikin Industries, a global manufacturer of both commercial and residential air conditioning equipment based in Osaka, Japan. Daikin had annual sales of $13 billion in 2009.

Daikin was named one of the 100 most sustainable corporations for three years in a row by Corporate Knights, Inc., from 2007 through 2009.

In 2010, McQuay acquired HydroKool LLC of Phoenix, Arizona, a designer and manufacturer of pre-packaged, pre-engineered custom HVAC solutions.

In 2010, the Daikin and McQuay Applied Development Center was certified as LEED Gold.

In late 2013, Daikin dropped the McQuay name, ending 80 years of business for the name.

== McQuay technological innovations ==
- 1932 - Hermetic Compressor
- 1951 – Packaged Terminal Air Conditioner (PTAC)
- 1962 - Packaged R-12 Positive Pressure Centrifugal Compressor Chiller
- 1971 - Dual Centrifugal Compressor Chiller
- 1988 - Chillers using HFC Refrigerants
- 1990 - Open Protocol™ Feature as a link Between Unit Controller and Building Automation System using open standard protocols
- 1994 - Large Tonnage Single Screw Compressor Chiller
- 1994 - Entire Line of Centrifugal Compressor Chillers Using HFC Refrigerants
- 1995 - Custom Modular Commercial Air Handler
- 2002 - First Commercial Water Source Heat Pump Using R-410A
- 2003 - Largest and Quietest Air-cooled Screw Compressor Chiller
- 2004 - Frictionless Magnetic Bearing Centrifugal compressor Chiller

== Products ==
- Air handlers
- Packaged rooftop systems including makeup air systems
- Chillers
- Coils
- Condensing units and condensers
- Fan coils
- Modular central chiller plants
- Packaged terminal air conditioners
- Self Contained systems
- Unit ventilators
- Water source heat pumps, including geothermal systems
- Aftermarket products and parts
- Maintenance, repair and upgrade services
- Sustainability
- Indoor air quality
