= Free cooling =

Using low external air temperatures to chill water

Free cooling is an economical method of using low external air temperatures to assist in chilling water, which can then be used for industrial processes or air conditioning systems. The chilled water can either be used immediately or be stored for the short- or long-term. When outdoor temperatures are lower relative to indoor temperatures, this system utilizes the cool outdoor air as a free cooling source. In this manner, the system replaces the chiller in traditional air conditioning systems while achieving the same cooling result. Such systems can be made for single buildings or district cooling networks.

== Operation ==
For a human-powered version, see yakhchal.

When the ambient air temperature drops to a set temperature, a modulating valve allows all or part of the chilled water to by-pass an existing chiller and run through the free cooling system, which uses less power and uses the lower ambient air temperature to cool the water in the system.

This can be achieved by installing an air blast cooler with any existing chiller or on its own. During low ambient temperatures, an installation can bypass an existing chiller giving energy savings of up to 75%, without compromising cooling requirements.

In heating, ventilation, and air conditioning (HVAC) in winter months, large commercial buildings' interior spaces may need cooling, even while perimeter spaces may need heating. Free cooling is the production of chilled water without the use of a chiller, and can be used generally in the late fall, winter and early spring, in temperate zones. Free cooling is not entirely free since the chiller is still operational.

== Methods ==
Assuming that the system can utilize free cooling, there are three ways to use free cooling:

=== Strainer cycle ===
The cooling tower water can be directly linked into the flow through the chilled water circuit. If the cooling tower is open, a strainer is required to eliminate any debris that could accumulate within the tower. The cost savings are associated with the limited use of the water chiller energy. There is an increased risk of corrosion using this method.

=== Plate and frame heat exchanger ===
A heat exchanger will transfer heat directly from the chilled water loop to the cooling tower loop. The exchanger keeps the cooling tower water separate from the coolant flowing through the cooling coils. The chiller water is thus pre-cooled and the building is liquid-cooled. An energy savings is due to reduced chiller loading and thus a reduction in energy consumption. There is an increase in cost due to the pump needing to compensate for the pressure differences.

=== Refrigeration migration ===
A valve arrangement within the water chiller opens a direct path between the condenser and the evaporator. The relatively warm fluid in the chiller loop vaporizes the refrigerant, and the energy is carried directly to the condenser, where it is cooled and condensed by the water from the cooling tower. This method is driven by the idea that the refrigerant tends to move towards the coldest point in a refrigeration circuit. The cost savings associated with this method are due to the compressor's inactivity, since the blower, fans and pumps are all operational.

== Seasons ==
=== High ambient temperature ===
When the process return water temperature is equal to or lower than the ambient air temperature, free cooling is not suitable. The system's three-way valve will bypass the free-cooling heat exchanger and direct the fluid flow through the chillers to be cooled to the required set-point temperature.

=== Mid-season operation ===
For mid-season operation, the water is partially cooled by the compressor and partially by the ambient temperature. The percentage of free cooling achieved mid-season depends on seasonal temperature although partial free cooling commences when the ambient air temperature is 1 °C below the process return water temperature. The water is partially cooled through the free cooler, then flows through the chillers to reach the required set point temperature.

=== Winter operation ===
In winter, when outdoor temperatures are low enough, the water is chilled solely by the free cooling coil. This allows the chillers' compressors to stop operating, saving significant amounts of energy. The only electrical power used in winter operation is for fan operation. This can be achieved once the ambient air temperature is 3 °C to 5 °C below the process supply water temperature.

== Limitations ==
Freezing can occur once the ambient air temperature gets below 0 °C. Another limitation is the temperature difference across the heat exchanger. A heat exchanger with a very low temperature difference across can become economically unrealistic. The economics of the heat exchanger allow for a minimum free cooling water temperature of about 5 °C.

== Data centers, Server rooms and Gsm Base Stations ==
=== Energy efficiency ===
United Kingdom: In 2013, Chancellor George Osborne agreed to make a concession for data centers to be exempt from Carbon Reduction Commitment (CRC) and allow them to produce their own Climate Change Agreement (CCA). This is also recognised by the new European Commission to reduce EU greenhouse gas emissions by 40% by 2030. Cooling data centers or server rooms requires a lot of energy; therefore free cooling can be an ideal solution to save energy.

=== Types ===
There are two free cooling options for a data center, server room and gsm base stations with the first one being an integral free cooling coil or a chiller which works alongside a free cooler unit. Integral chillers are ideal for sites which have limited space and can offer high energy efficiency levels. These units feature high-quality components including scroll and screw compressors, axial fans, and three-way modulating valves.

The other option is an independent free cooler that has a greater capacity for heat exchange, as it is sized to maximise efficiency, allowing a larger area for the transfer of thermal energy. Independent free coolers have shown energy savings of up to 70%.

== See also ==
- Economizer
