= Chiller boiler system =

A chiller boiler system includes a chiller, a boiler, pumps and HVAC controls in a single pre-engineered package. This reduces complexity for the field installer and increases the simplicity of installation overall. Most chiller boiler packaged systems are designed for large residential and small commercial structures.

A chiller boiler system is a hydronic system. It uses water instead of air to heat and cool a structure. A properly designed hydronic system is usually more efficient than a standard forced air system.

Chiller boiler systems use radiant heating and cooling or fan coil systems to condition a home or business. This allows for multiple zones (a thermostat in each living area of the house) for increased comfort and decreased energy use.

Compared with air, water is a more space-efficient method of transferring heat around, into, and out of a building. A pipe of a given diameter can transfer heat at the same rate as an air duct with eighteen times the cross-section area and is much easier to install in small spaces.
