= Sound attenuator =

HVAC noise control treatment

A sound attenuator, or duct silencer, sound trap, or muffler, is a noise control acoustical treatment of Heating Ventilating and Air-Conditioning (HVAC) ductwork designed to reduce transmission of noise through the ductwork, either from equipment into occupied spaces in a building, or between occupied spaces.

In its simplest form, a sound attenuator consists of a baffle within the ductwork. These baffles often contain sound-absorbing materials. The physical dimensions and baffle configuration of sound attenuators are selected to attenuate a specific range of frequencies. Unlike conventional internally-lined ductwork, which is only effective at attenuating mid- and high-frequency noise, sound attenuators can achieve broader band attenuation in relatively short lengths. Certain types of sound attenuators are essentially a Helmholtz resonator used as a passive noise-control device.

== Configuration ==
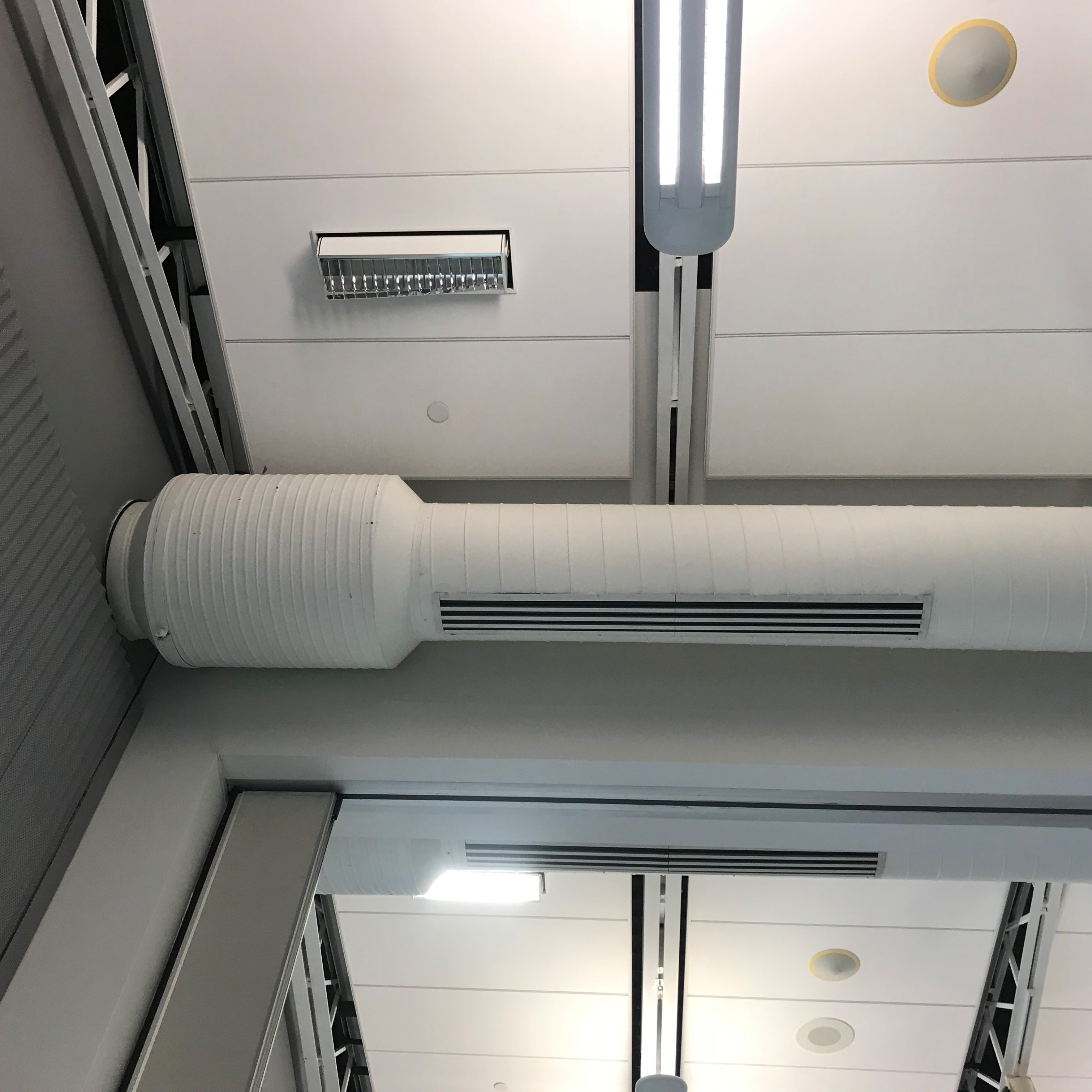
Circular sound attenuator (left of the grille)

Generally, sound attenuators consist of the following elements:

- An inner perforated layer of light gauge sheet metal (baffle)
- The baffle is then filled with sound-absorptive insulation
  - In high velocity systems, or when there is a concern for particulate matter in the air stream, a bagged or mylar-faced insulation is used.
  - Packless sound attenuators do not include sound-absorptive insulation. As a result, the high-frequency insertion loss of a packless sound trap is greatly reduced. Bagged insulation or packless sound attenuators are typically referred to as "hospital grade" attenuators.
- An outer non-perforated layer of sheet metal. The outer layer is typically heavy gauge sheet metal (18ga or stiffer) to minimize duct break-out and break-in noise.
  - The gauge of circular sound attenuators is typically less of a consideration, as circular ductwork is considerably stiffer than rectangular ductwork and less prone to duct breakout noise.

Sound attenuators are available in circular and rectangular form factors. Prefabricated rectangular sound attenuators typically come in 3, 5, 7, or 9-ft lengths. The width and height of the sound attenuators are often determined by the surrounding ductwork, though extended media options are available for improved attenuation. The baffles of rectangular sound attenuators are commonly referred to as splitters, whereas circular sound attenuators contain a bullet-shaped baffle.

Sound attenuators are typically classified as "Low," "Medium," or "High" based on performance characteristics and/or duct velocity. An example classification scheme is listed below.

Sound Attenuator Classification at 1000 ft/min
Shape	Pressure Drop	Attenuator Classification
Rectangular	<0.10 in. w.g.	"Low"
Rectangular	0.10-0.30 in. w.g.	"Medium"
Rectangular	> 0.30 in. w.g.	"High"
Cylindrical	< 0.03 in w.g.	"Low"
Cylindrical	> 0.03 in w.g.	"High"

== Properties ==
The acoustical properties of commercially available sound attenuators are tested in accordance with ASTM E477: Standard Test Method for Laboratory Measurements of Acoustical and Airflow Performance of Duct Liner Materials and Prefabricated Silencers. These tests are conducted at NVLAP-accredited facilities and then reported by the manufacturer in marketing or engineering bulletins. Outside of the US, sound attenuators are tested in accordance with British Standard 4718 (legacy) or ISO 7235.

=== Dynamic insertion loss ===
The dynamic insertion loss of a sound attenuator is the amount of attenuation, in decibels, provided by the silencer under flow conditions. While flow conditions in typical low velocity duct systems rarely exceed 2000–3000 ft/min, sound attenuators for steam vents must withstand airflow velocities in the 15,000-20,000 ft/min. range. The acoustic performance of a sound attenuator is tested over a range of airflow velocities, and for forward and reverse flow conditions. Forward flow is when the air and sound waves propagate in the same direction. The insertion loss of a silencer is defined as

$IL\ (dB)=10\log( \frac{W_0}{W_m})$

where:

$W_0$= Radiated sound power from the duct with the attenuator

$W_m$= Radiated sound power from the duct without the attenuator

Some manufacturers report the static insertion loss of the silencer, which is typically measured with a loudspeaker in lieu of a fan to represent a zero flow condition. These values can be useful in the design of smoke evacuation systems, where sound attenuators are used to attenuate exterior noise that breaks into the exhaust ductwork.

The insertion loss of a sound attenuator is sometimes referred to as transmission loss.

=== Regenerated noise ===
The internal baffles of a sound attenuator constrict airflow, which in turn generates turbulent noise. Noise generated by a sound attenuator is directly related to the airflow velocity at the constriction, and changes proportionally with the face area of the sound attenuator.

The change in generated noise can be expressed as

$Generated\ Noise\ (dB)=10\log( \frac{A_1}{A_0})$

where:

$A_1$= The new face area of the sound attenuator

$A_0$= Reference face area of the sound attenuator

For example, if the attenuator doubles in width, while maintaining a constant airflow velocity, the generated noise will increase by 3 dB. Conversely, if the attenuator shrinks by a factor of 10, while keeping the airflow velocity constant, the generated noise will decrease by 10 dB. Since turbulence generated noise caused by duct fittings changes at a rate of $50log$, airflow velocities are a critical component of attenuator sizing.

Regenerated noise should always be reviewed, but it is usually only a concern in very quiet rooms (e.g. concert halls, recording studios, music rehearsal rooms) or when the ductwork velocity is greater than 1500 ft/m.

There is a prediction formula that can be used to estimate duct silencer regenerated noise if no data exists

$Lw=55log(V/V_0)+10log(N)+10log(H/H_0)-45$

where:

$Lw$ = sound power level generated by the sound attenuator (dB)

$V$ = velocity at the constricted cross-area (ft/min)

$V_0$ = reference velocity (196.8 ft/min)

$N$ = number of air passages (number of splitters)

$H$ = height or circumference of the sound attenuator (in)

$H_0$ = reference dimension (0.0394 in)

=== Pressure drop ===
Similar to other duct fittings, sound attenuators cause pressure drop. Catalog pressure drop values obtained through ASTM E477 assume ideal, laminar airflow, which is not allow always found in field installations. The ASHRAE Handbook provides pressure drop correction factors for different inlet and outlet conditions. These correction factors are used whenever there's a turbulent wake within 3 to 5 duct diameters upstream or downstream of the attenuator.

Where sound attenuator dimensions differ from surrounding duct dimensions, transitions to and from the sound attenuator should be smooth and gradual. Abrupt transitions cause the pressure drop and regenerated noise to significantly increase.

The pressure drop through a sound attenuator is typically higher than the pressure drop for an equivalent length of lined duct. However, significantly longer lengths of lined duct are required to achieve equal attenuation, at which point the pressure drop of large extents of lined duct is significantly greater than incurred through a single sound attenuator.

Friction losses due to dissipative sound attenuators can be expressed as

$Friction\ Loss=\frac{P}{A}l(K_f\frac{1}{2}\rho v_p^2), \ N/m^2$

where:

$\frac{P}{A}$ = ratio of the sound attenuator perimeter and area

$l$ = length of the duct

$K_f$ = The friction loss coefficient

$\rho$ = density of air

$v_p^2$ = passage velocity

The perimeter, area, and length of the sound attenuator are also parameters which affect its pressure drop. Friction loss at the sound attenuator is directly proportional to its noise attenuation performance, whereby greater attenuation usually equates to greater pressure drop.

== Design variations ==
Prefabricated sound attenuators rose to prominence in the late 1950s-early 1960s. Several manufacturers were among the first to produce and test prefabricated sound attenuators: Koppers, Industrial Acoustics Company, Industrial Sound Control, and Elof Hansson.

Though rectangular dissipative attenuators are the most common variant of attenuators used today in architectural acoustics noise control, other design options exist.

=== Reactive silencers ===
Reactive silencers are very common in muffler design of automobiles and trucks. Attenuation is primarily achieved through sound reflection, area change, and tuned chambers. The design of reactive silencers from scratch is mathematically intensive, so manufacturers often have a number of prefabricated designs.

=== Dissipative silencers ===
Dissipative silencers attenuate sound by transferring sound energy to heat. Dissipative silencers are used when broadband attenuation with low pressure drop is desired. In typical ductwork, high frequencies propagate down the duct as a beam, and minimally interact with the outer, lined edges. Sound attenuators with baffles that break the line of sight or elbow attenuators with a bend provide better high frequency attenuation than conventional lined ductwork. Generally, longer attenuators with thicker baffles will have a greater insertion loss over a wider frequency range.

These types of attenuators are commonly used on air handling units, ducted fan coil units, and at the air intake of compressors, gas turbines, and other ventilated equipment enclosures. On certain air handling unit or fan applications, it is common to use a co-planar silencer—a dissipative silencer that is sized for the fan and mounted directly to the fan outlet. This is a common feature in fan array design.

=== Crosstalk silencers ===
Purpose-built sound attenuators to prevent crosstalk between two closed, private spaces. Their design typically incorporates one or more bends to form a "Z" or "U" shape. This bend increases the efficacy of the sound attenuator without significantly increasing its overall length. Crosstalk attenuators are passive devices and should be sized for extremely low pressure drops — typically less than 0.05 inches w.g.

=== Exhaust registers ===
In the early 1970s, American SF Products, Inc. created the KGE Exhaust Register, which was an air distribution device with an integral sound attenuator.

== Noise control implementation ==
First, the project noise control engineer (or acoustician), mechanical engineer, and equipment representative select the quietest possible equipment which meets the mechanical requirements and budget constraints of the project. Then, the noise control engineers will typically calculate out the path, without the attenuator first. The required sound attenuator insertion loss is the difference between the calculated path and the target background noise level. If no attenuator selection is feasible, the noise control engineer and mechanical must re-evaluate the path between the equipment and the sound attenuator. When space constraints do not allow for a straight attenuator, an elbow or transitional attenuator can be used.

Duct silencers are prominently featured in systems where fiberglass internal duct liner is prohibited. While fiberglass's contribution to air quality is insignificant, many higher education projects have adopted a limit on internal fiberglass liner. In these situations, the project acoustician must rely on duct silencers as the primary means of fan noise and duct-borne noise attenuation.

Sound attenuators are typically located near ducted mechanical equipment, to attenuate noise which propagates down the duct. This creates a trade-off: the sound attenuator should be located near the fan and yet the air is typically more turbulent closer to fans and dampers. Ideally, sound attenuators should straddle the wall of the mechanical equipment room provided there are no fire dampers. If a sound attenuator is located over occupied space, the noise control engineer should confirm that duct breakout noise is not an issue prior to the attenuator. If there is significant distance between the attenuator and the mechanical room penetration, additional duct cladding (such as external fiberglass blanket or gypsum lagging) may be required to prevent noise from breaking into the duct and bypassing the attenuator.

Sound attenuators can also be used outdoors to quiet cooling towers, air intake of emergency generators, and exhaust fans. Larger equipment will require an array of sound attenuators, otherwise known as an attenuator bank.

== See also ==
- Ductwork
- HVAC
