= Ken Parsons =

English professor (born 1953)

Ken Parsons (born 1953) is an English engineer, now emeritus professor of environmental ergonomics at Loughborough University.

== Education and early career ==
Parsons was born and spent his early life in northeast England. After grammar school he went to Loughborough University in 1971, graduating with a degree in ergonomics in 1974. After a year at Hughes Hall, Cambridge University where he obtained a post-graduate certificate in education in mathematics, he pursued a PhD on human responses to vibration at the Institute of Sound and Vibration Research at Southampton University, awarded in 1980. He then returned to Loughborough University and founded the Human Thermal Environments Laboratory in 1981.

In 1992 he received the Ralph G. Nevins award from the American Society of Heating, Refrigerating and Air-Conditioning Engineers (ASHRAE) for ‘significant accomplishments in the study of bioenvironmental engineering and its impact on human comfort and health. He gained a certificate in management from the Open University in 1993.

== Later career ==
Parsons became head of Loughborough's Department of Human Sciences in 1996, Dean of Science in 2003 and pro-vice chancellor for research from 2009 to 2012. He was chair of the United Kingdom Dean of Sciences from 2008 to 2010.

He is a fellow of the Institute of Ergonomics and Human Factors, the International Ergonomics Association and the Royal Society of Medicine. He is a registered European Ergonomist and has been an elected member of the council of the Ergonomics Society. He has been scientific advisor to the Defence Evaluation Research Agency and the Defence Clothing and Textile Agency and a member of the Defence Scientific Advisory Committee. He has been both secretary and chair of the thermal factors committee of the International Commission on Occupational Health (ICOH), chair of the CNRS advisory committee to the Laboratoire de Physiologie et Psychologie Environmentales in Strasbourg, France, and is a life member of the Indian Ergonomics Society. He is advisor to the World Health Organization on heatwaves, and a visiting professor to Chongqing University in China, where he has been appointed to the National Centre for International Research of Low Carbon and Green Buildings.

He is co-founder of the UK Indoor Environments Group and a founding member of the UK Clothing Group, the European Society for Protective Clothing, the Network for Comfort and Energy Use in Buildings and the thermal factors scientific committee of the ICOH. He is chair of ISO TC 159 SC5 ‘Ergonomics of the physical environments, chair of the British Standards Institution committee on the ergonomics of the physical environment and convener of CEN TC 122 WG11, the European standards committee concerned with the ergonomics of the physical environment.

Other positions include: visiting professor of the International Conference on Environmental Ergonomics, co-editor in chief of the Journal of Applied Ergonomics, and posts on the editorial boards of Industrial Health and the Journal of Annals of Occupational Hygiene and Physiological Anthropology.

== Publications ==
- Human Thermal Environments 3rd Ed. 2013, 2nd Ed. 2002, 1st Ed. 1992. Published by CRC Press.
- Human Thermal Comfort, 2020. Published by CRC Press.
- Co-author of the British Occupational Hygiene Society publication on thermal environments
- Contributor to the Chartered Institution of Building Services Engineers publications on thermal comfort
- Contributor to the ASHRAE Handbook: Fundamentals
- Various academic research articles

== Awards and recognition ==
- Ralph G. Nevins award from ASHRAE for ‘significant accomplishments in the study of bioenvironmental engineering and its impact on human comfort and health’, 1992.
- President's Medal of the Ergonomics Society, 2001 to the Human Thermal Environments Laboratory, Loughborough University
