= Cooling unit =

Cooling unit may refer to:

- Air conditioner
- Chiller
- Evaporative cooler
- Fan (machine)
- Refrigerator
