= Water chiller =

Device used to lower water temperature

A water chiller is a device used to lower the temperature of water. Most chillers use refrigerant in a closed loop system to facilitate heat exchange from water where the refrigerant is then pumped to a location where the waste heat is transferred to the atmosphere. However, there are other methods in performing this action.

In hydroponics, pumps, lights and ambient heat can warm the reservoir water temperatures, leading to plant root and health problems. For ideal plant health, a chiller can be used to lower the water temperature below ambient level; 68 °F (20 °C) is a good temperature for most plants. This results in healthy root production and efficient absorption of nutrients.

In air conditioning, chilled water is often used to cool a building's air and equipment, especially in situations where many individual rooms must be controlled separately, such as a hotel. A chiller lowers water temperature to between 40 °F (4 °C) and 45 °F (7 °C) before the water is pumped to the location to be cooled.

== See also ==
- Chiller
- Gardening
