= Wrightsoft =

Software developer

Wrightsoft Corp.
- Company logo since 2006
- Type: Private
- Founded: 1985
- Headquarters: Lexington, Massachusetts, USA
- Key people: Bill Wright (President & CEO); Chris Edgren (Vice President Sales & Marketing); Michael Shnitman (Vice President Software Development); Charles S. "Chip" Barnaby (Vice President Research)
- Website: www.wrightsoft.com

Wrightsoft is a software development firm for heating, ventilation, and air conditioning (HVAC). Established in 1985, Wrightsoft has served residential, commercial, and educational markets by providing HVAC design, specification, and sales software. Wrightsoft is headquartered in Lexington, Massachusetts, USA.

== History ==
In 1985, while conducting a graduate HVAC seminar at the Massachusetts Institute of Technology (MIT), Bill Wright entered into a partnership with the Air Conditioning Contractors of America to design software for HVAC Manual J load calculations. As the original technical software partner of ACCA, Wrightsoft Corp became the first HVAC software company to create a computerized version of their Manual J, Manual D, and Manual N calculation methods.

The Air Conditioning Contractors of America and Wrightsoft released the very first Manual J Load calculation software (Right-J) in February 1986.

== Former logos ==
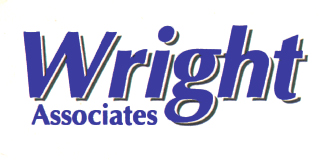
Wright Associates (1986–1995)

Wrightsoft: 1st Logo (1996–2006)

== See also ==
- Heating, Ventilating & Air Conditioning (HVAC)
- American Society of Heating, Refrigerating and Air-Conditioning Engineers (ASHRAE)
- ASHRAE Handbook

== Sources ==
- Weil, Michael S. (May 1997). "From Drafting Table to CAD and Beyond". Contracting Business: 60–65.
- Wright, Bill (May 10, 1999). "New diagram-based software offers a higher level of automated design". ACHR theNews. Vol. 207, no. 2. p. 18.
- Feldman, William; Feldman, Patti (July 2001). "Software may be Wright for commercial jobs". Contractor. 48 (7): 32.
- Hall, John R. "Contractor demonstrates residential design software. (MIACCA)." Air Conditioning, Heating & Refrigeration News 216.3 (May 20, 2002): 9(1)
- Dunlop, Jodi "2004 AHR Expo Innovation Award Winners Selected" ASHRAE Journal (Jan 2004): Vol. 46 Issue 1, pS14-S15, 2p
- Bushnell, Davis "He caught wind of a software need" The Boston Globe [0743-1791] (June 28, 2007)
- Harris, Angela D. "Software adds sizzle to the sale." Air Conditioning, Heating & Refrigeration News 233.9 (Feb 25, 2008): p1(3)
