= Pal Heights =

- Location: Bhubaneswar, Odisha, India
- Coordinates: 20.27°N 85.84°E
- Opened: 2008
- Developer: Pal Heights Group
- Num. of stores: 50
- Floor area: 200,000 sq ft (19,000 m^{2})
- Floors: G+3
- Website: palheights.com

Pal Heights is a shopping mall located at Jayadev Vihar, Bhubaneswar in the state of Odisha, India. It has a floor area of two hundred thousand square feet. Opened in 2008, the mall is one of the largest malls in Odisha. The mall is next to the Pal Heights Hotel in Jaydev Vihar, a neighborhood of Bhubaneswar. It contains approximately 50 outlets, including cafeterias, food courts, and restaurants as well as parking spaces and a hypermarket.

== Specifications ==
- 100% Power Backup
- Fire Fighting System
- HVAC and AHU
- RCC Framed Earthquake Resistant

== Features ==
=== Leisure ===
- Plaza

=== Hospitality ===
- Cafeteria
- Food Court
- Restaurants

=== Business ===
- Office Spaces

=== Others ===
- Departmental Anchors
- Hypermarket
