= Fan coil unit =

HVAC device

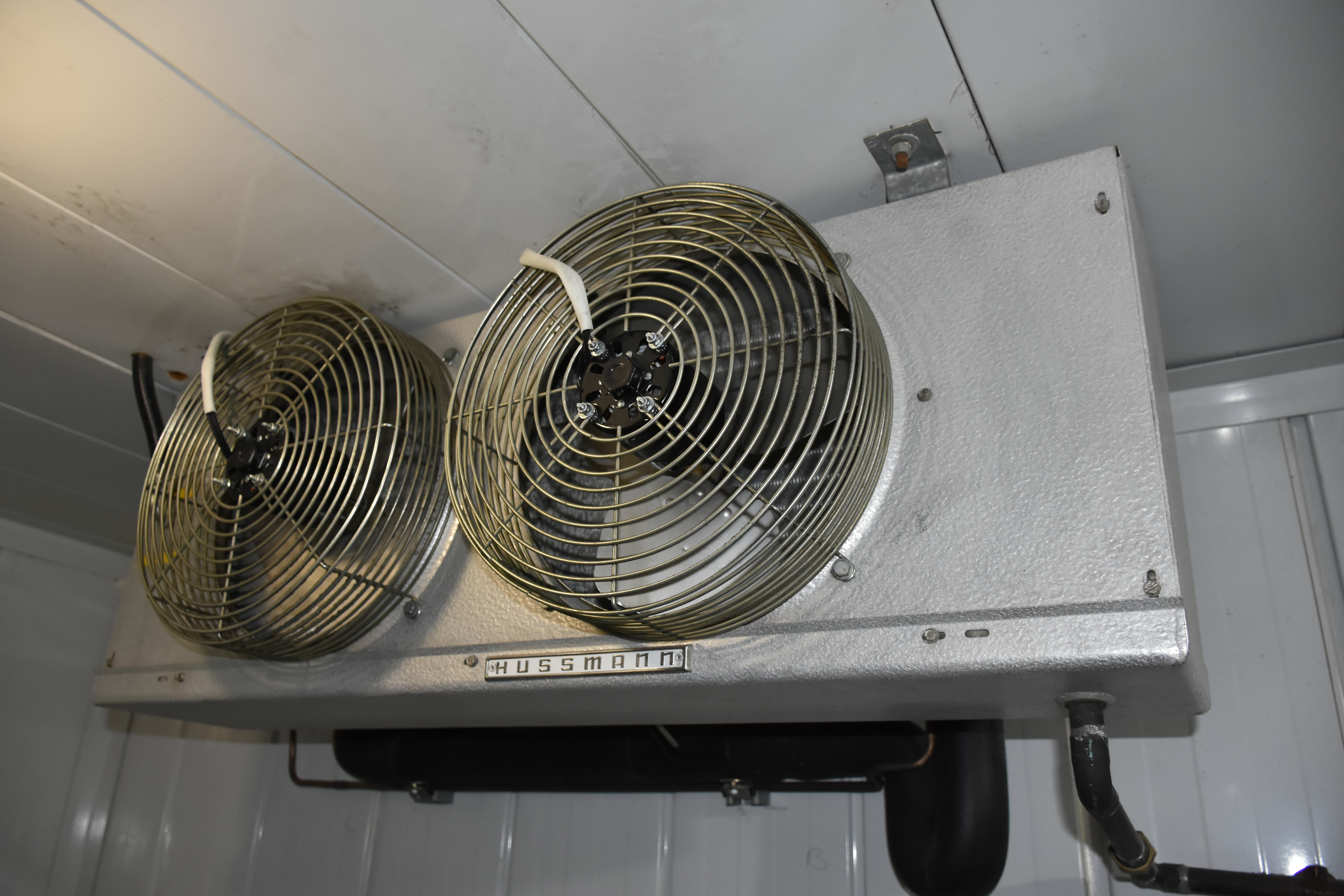
Refrigerant based Fan-Coil Unit. Other variants utilise a chilled, or heated water loop for space cooling, or heating, respectively.

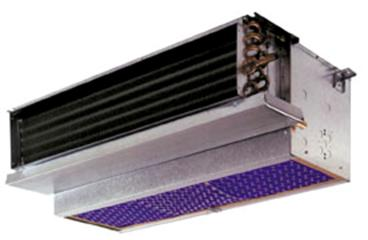

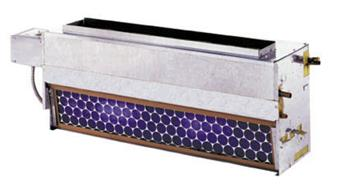

A fan coil unit (FCU), also known as a Vertical Fan Coil Unit (VFCU), is a device consisting of a heat exchanger (coil) and a fan. FCUs are commonly used in HVAC systems of residential, commercial, and industrial buildings that use ducted split air conditioning or central plant cooling. FCUs are typically connected to ductwork and a thermostat to regulate the temperature of one or more spaces and to assist the main air handling unit for each space if used with chillers. The thermostat controls the fan speed and/or the flow of water or refrigerant to the heat exchanger using a control valve. These units merely add or remove heat, they do not exchange fresh air nor filter dust or volatile organic compounds.

Due to their simplicity, flexibility, and easy maintenance, fan coil units can be more economical to install than ducted 100% fresh air systems (VAV) or central heating systems with air handling units or chilled beams. Various configurations of FCU are available, including horizontal (ceiling-mounted) and vertical (floor-mounted), and can be used in a wide range of applications, from small residential units to large commercial and industrial buildings.

Noise output from FCUs, like any other form of air conditioning, depends on the building materials surrounding the unit and its design. Some FCUs offer noise levels as low as NR25 or NC25.

The output from an FCU can be estimated by measuring the temperature difference between the air entering and leaving the unit, coupled with the volume of air being moved through the unit. This is a simplistic statement, and there is further reading on sensible heat ratios and the specific heat capacity of air, both of which have an effect on thermal performance.

== Design and operation ==
The term Fan Coil Unit covers a range of products and will mean different things to users, specifiers, and installers in different countries and regions, particularly in relation to product size and output capability.

Fan Coil Units fall principally into two main types: blow-through and draw-through. As the names suggest, in the first type, the fans are fitted behind the heat exchanger, and in the other type, the fans are fitted in front of the coil, and draw air through it. Draw-through units are considered thermally superior, as ordinarily they make better use of the heat exchanger. However, they are more expensive, as they require a chassis to hold the fans, whereas a blow-through unit typically consists of a set of fans bolted straight to a coil.

A fan coil unit may be concealed or exposed within the room or area that it serves.

An exposed fan coil unit may be wall-mounted, freestanding or ceiling-mounted, and typically has an appropriate enclosure to protect and conceal the fan coil unit itself, with the return air grille and a supply air diffuser set into that enclosure to distribute the air.

A concealed fan coil unit will typically be installed within an accessible ceiling void or services zone. The return air grille and supply air diffuser are typically set flush into the ceiling, and will be ducted to and from the fan coil unit, allowing a great degree of flexibility for locating the grilles to suit the ceiling layout and/or the partition layout within a space. It is quite common for the return air not to be ducted and to use the ceiling void as a return air plenum.

The coil receives hot or cold water from a central plant, and removes heat from or adds heat to the air through heat transfer. Traditionally, fan coil units can contain their own internal thermostat, or can be wired to operate with a remote thermostat. However, and as is common in most modern buildings with a Building Energy Management System (BEMS), the control of the fan coil unit will be by a local digital controller or outstation (along with associated room temperature sensor and control valve actuators) linked to the BEMS via a communication network, and therefore adjustable and controllable from a central point, such as a supervisors head end computer.

Fan coil units circulate hot or cold water through a coil in order to condition a space. The unit gets its hot or cold water from a central plant, or mechanical room containing equipment for removing heat from the central building's closed-loop. The equipment used can consist of machines used to remove heat such as a chiller or a cooling tower and equipment for adding heat to the building's water such as a boiler or a commercial water heater.

Hydronic fan coil units can be generally divided into two types: Two-pipe fan coil units or four-pipe fan coil units. Two-pipe fan coil units have one supply and one return pipe. The supply pipe supplies either cold or hot water to the unit, depending on the time of year. Four-pipe fan coil units have two supply pipes and two return pipes. This allows either hot or cold water to enter the unit at any given time. Since it is often necessary to heat and cool different areas of a building at the same time, due to differences in internal heat loss or heat gains, the four-pipe fan coil unit is most commonly used.

Fan coil units may be connected to piping networks using various topology designs, such as "direct return", "reverse return", or "series decoupled". See ASHRAE Handbook "2008 Systems & Equipment", Chapter 12.

Depending upon the selected chilled water temperatures and the relative humidity of the space, it's likely that the cooling coil will dehumidify the entering air stream, and as a byproduct of this process, it will at times produce a condensate which will need to be carried to drain. The fan coil unit will contain a purpose-designed drip tray with a drain connection for this purpose. The simplest means to drain the condensate from multiple fan coil units will be by a network of pipework laid to falls to a suitable point. Alternatively, a condensate pump may be employed where space for such gravity pipework is limited.

The fan motors within a fan coil unit are responsible for regulating the desired heating and cooling output of the unit. Different manufacturers employ various methods for controlling the motor speed. Some utilise an AC transformer, adjusting the taps to modulate the power supplied to the fan motor. This adjustment is typically performed during the commissioning stage of building construction and remains fixed for the lifespan of the unit.

Alternatively, certain manufacturers employ custom-wound Permanent Split Capacitor (PSC) motors with speed taps in the windings. These taps are set to the desired speed levels for the specific design of the fan coil unit. To enable local control, a simple speed selector switch (Off-High-Medium-Low) is provided for the occupants of the room. This switch is often integrated into the room thermostat and can be manually set or automatically controlled by a digital room thermostat.

For automatic fan speed and temperature control, Building Energy Management Systems are employed. The fan motors commonly used in these units are typically AC Shaded Pole or Permanent Split Capacitor motors. Recent advancements include the use of brushless DC designs with electronic commutation. Compared to units equipped with asynchronous 3-speed motors, fan coil units utilising brushless motors can reduce power consumption by up to 70%.

Fan coil units linked to ducted split air conditioning units use refrigerant in the cooling coil instead of chilled coolant and are linked to a large condenser unit instead of a chiller. They might also be linked to liquid-cooled condenser units, which use an intermediate coolant to cool the condenser using cooling towers.

== DC/EC motor powered units ==
These motors are sometimes called DC motors, sometimes EC motors and occasionally DC/EC motors. DC stands for direct current and EC stands for electronically commutated.

DC motors allow the speed of the fans within a fan coil unit to be controlled by means of a 0-10 Volt input control signal to the motor/s, the transformers and speed switches associated with AC fan coils are not required. Up to a signal voltage of 2.5 Volts (which may vary with different fan/motor manufacturers), the fan will be in a stopped condition, but as the signal voltage is increased, the fan will seamlessly increase in speed until the maximum is reached at a signal Voltage of 10 Volts. Fan coils will generally operate between approximately 4 Volts and 7.5 Volts because below 4 Volts the air volumes are ineffective and above 7.5 Volts the fan coil is likely to be too noisy for most commercial applications.

The 0-10 Volt signal voltage can either be set via a simple potentiometer, or the 0-10 Volt signal voltage can be delivered to the fan motors by the terminal controller on each of the Fan Coil Units. The former is very simple and cheap, but the latter opens up the opportunity to continuously alter the fan speed depending on various external conditions/influences. These conditions/criteria could be the 'real time' demand for either heating or cooling, occupancy levels, window switches, time clocks or any number of other inputs from either the unit itself, the Building Management System or both.

The reason that these DC Fan Coil Units are, despite their apparent relative complexity, becoming more popular is their improved energy efficiency levels compared to their AC motor-driven counterparts of only a few years ago. A straight swap, AC to DC, will reduce electrical consumption by 50% but applying Demand and Occupancy-dependent fan speed control can take the savings to as much as 80%. In areas of the world where there are legally enforceable energy efficiency requirements for fan coils (such as the UK), DC Fan Coil Units are rapidly becoming the only choice.

== Areas of use ==
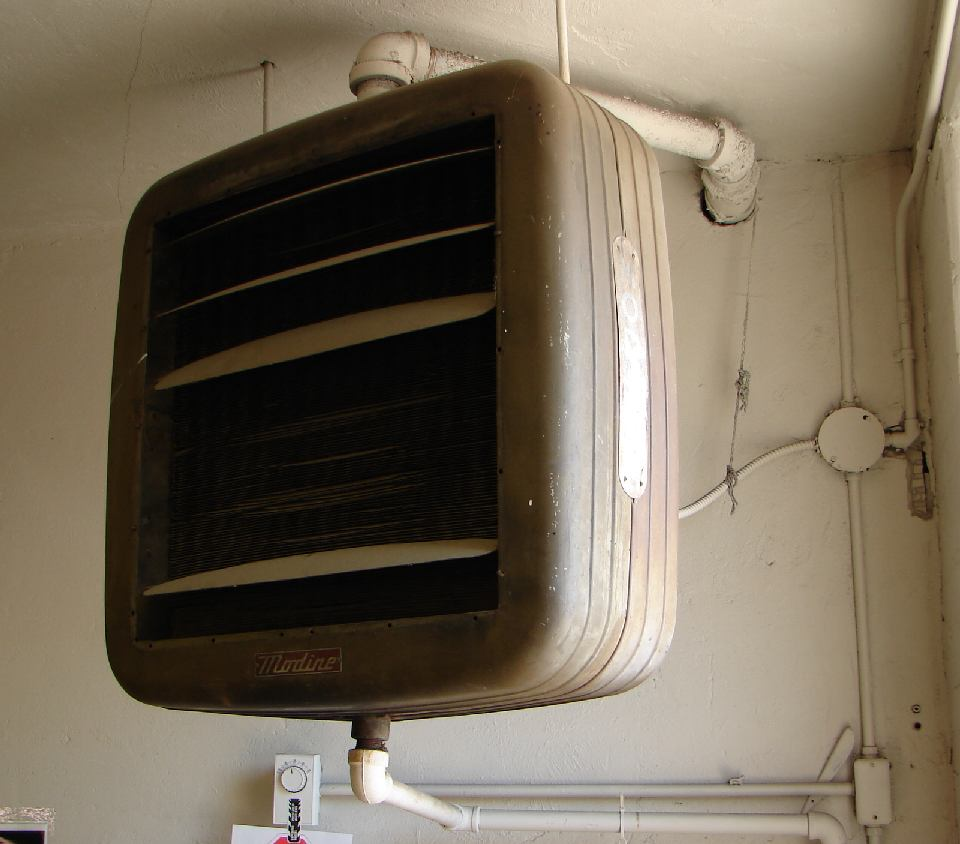

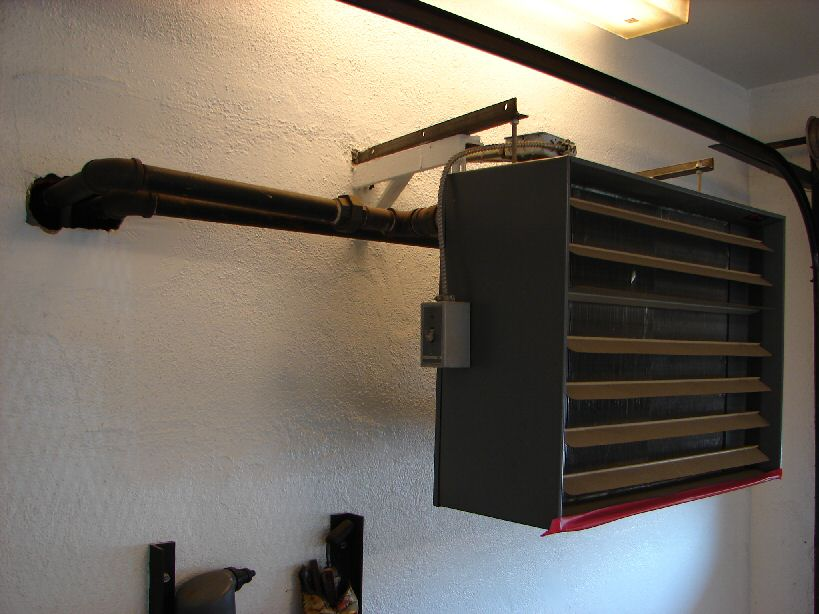

In high-rise buildings, fan coils may be vertically stacked, located one above the other from floor to floor and all interconnected by the same piping loop.

Fan coil units are an excellent delivery mechanism for hydronic chiller boiler systems in large residential and light commercial applications. In these applications, the fan coil units are mounted in bathroom ceilings and can be used to provide unlimited comfort zones - with the ability to turn off unused areas of the structure to save energy.

== Installation ==
In high-rise residential construction, typically each fan coil unit requires a rectangular through-penetration in the concrete slab on top of which it sits. Usually, there are either 2 or 4 pipes made of ABS, steel or copper that go through the floor. The pipes are usually insulated with refrigeration insulation, such as acrylonitrile butadiene/polyvinyl chloride (AB/PVC) flexible foam (Rubatex or Armaflex brands) on all pipes, or at least on the chilled water lines to prevent condensate from forming.

== Unit ventilator ==
A unit ventilator is a fan coil unit that is used mainly in classrooms, hotels, apartments and condominium applications. A unit ventilator can be a wall-mounted or ceiling-hung cabinet, and is designed to use a fan to blow outside air across a coil, thus conditioning and ventilating the space which it serves.

== European market ==
The Fan Coil is composed of one quarter of 2-pipe-units and three quarters of 4-pipe-units, and the most sold products are "with casing" (35%), "without casing" (28%), "cassette" (18%) and "ducted" (16%).

The market by region was split in 2010 as follows:

Region	Sales Volume in units	Share
Benelux	33 725	2.6%
France	168 028	13.2%
Germany	63 256	5.0%
Greece	33 292	2.6%
Italy	409 830	32.1%
Poland	32 987	2.6%
Portugal	22 957	1.8%
Russia, Ukraine and CIS countries	87 054	6.8%
Scandinavia and Baltic countries	39 124	3.1%
Spain	91 575	7.2%
Turkey	70 682	5.5%
UK and Ireland	69 169	5.4%
Eastern Europe	153 847	12.1%

== See also ==
- Thermal insulation
- HVAC
- Construction
- Intumescent
- Firestop
