= Chilled water =

Cooling commodity

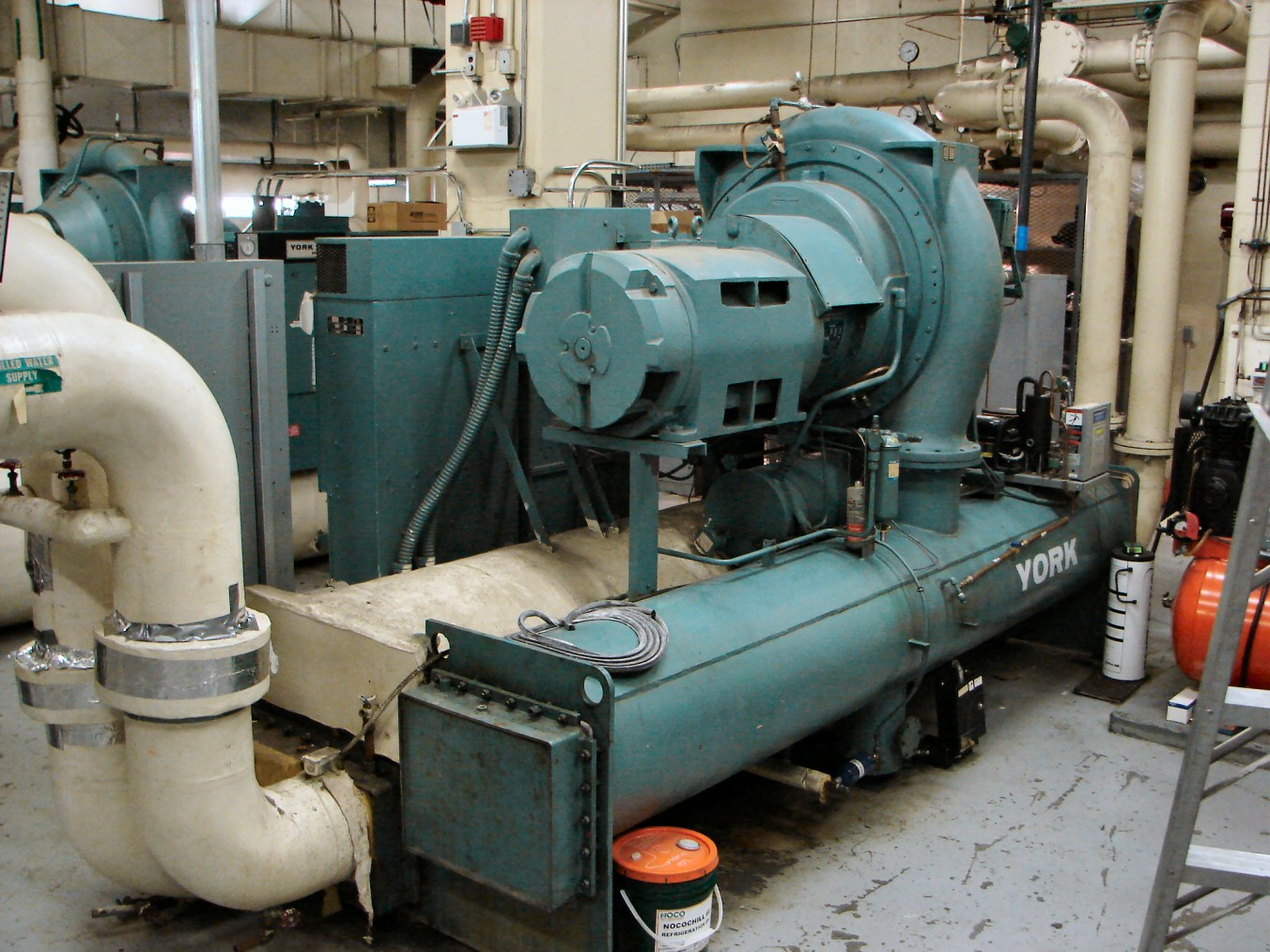
A chiller used to create chilled water as part of a chilled water system

Chilled water is a commodity often used to cool a building's air and equipment, especially in situations where many individual rooms must be controlled separately, such as a hotel. The chilled water can be supplied by a vendor, such as a public utility, or created at the location of the building that will use it, which has been the norm.

== Use ==
Chilled water cooling is similar in function, but differs from a typical residential air conditioning system in the medium used for rejecting heat from the air. Instead of a low-pressure refrigerant, chilled water cooling uses water to cool the air.

Regardless of who provides it, the chilled water (between 3 and 6 °C (37 and 43 °F)) is pumped through an air handler, which captures the heat from the air, then disperses the air throughout the area to be cooled.

== Site generated ==
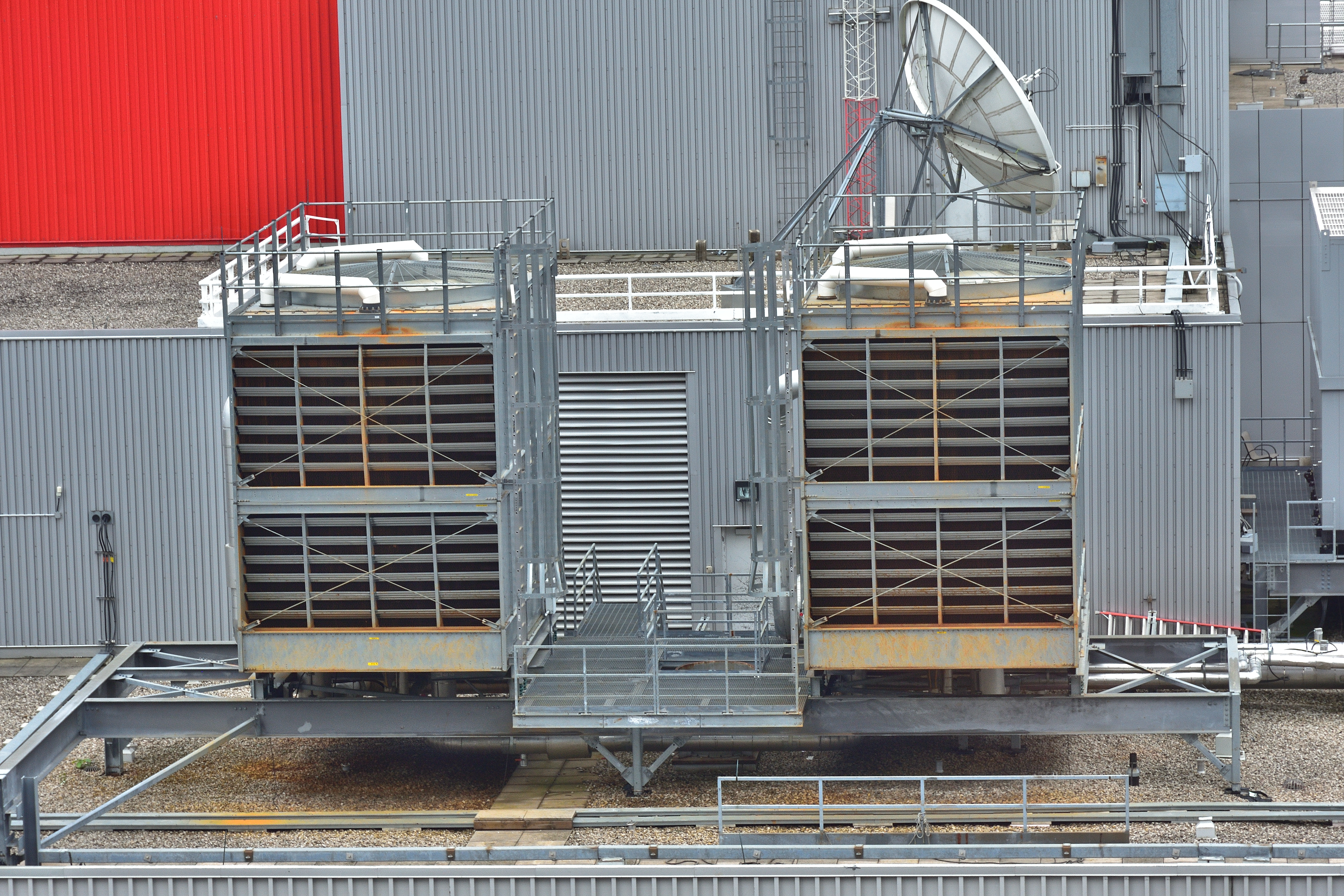
The cooling towers of a large chilled water system.

As part of a chilled water system, the condenser water absorbs heat from the refrigerant in the condenser barrel of the water chiller and is then sent via return lines to a cooling tower, which is a heat exchange device used to transfer waste heat to the atmosphere. The extent to which the cooling tower decreases the temperature depends upon the outside temperature, the relative humidity and the atmospheric pressure. The water in the chilled water circuit will be lowered to the Wet-bulb temperature or dry-bulb temperature before proceeding to the water chiller, where it is cooled to between 3 and 6 °C and pumped to the air handler, where the cycle is repeated. The equipment required includes chillers, cooling towers, pumps and electrical control equipment. The initial capital outlay for these is substantial and maintenance costs can fluctuate. Adequate space must be included in building design for the physical plant and access to equipment.

== Utility generated ==
The chilled water, having absorbed heat from the air, is sent via return lines back to the utility facility, where the process described in the previous section occurs. Utility generated chilled water eliminates the need for chillers and cooling towers at the property, reduces capital outlays and eliminates ongoing maintenance costs. The physical space saved can also become rentable, increasing revenue.

Utility supplied chilled water has been used successfully since the 1960s in many cities, and technological advances in the equipment, controls and trenchless installation have increased efficiency and lowered costs.

The advantage of utility-supplied chilled water is based on economy of scale. A utility can operate one large system more economically than a customer can operate the individual system in one building. The utility's system also has back-up capacity to protect against sudden outages. The cost of such "insurance" is also markedly lower than what it would be for an individual structure.

The use of utility supplied chilled water is most cost effective when it is designed into the building's infrastructure or when chiller/cooling tower equipment must be replaced. Commercial customers often lower their air conditioning costs from 10 to 20% by purchasing chilled water.

== Chilled water storage ==
Water can also be chilled at night, where electricity is available at off-peak rates, then stored in a large, insulated tank until needed, the next day, for cooling.
