= Air handler =

Device used to regulate and circulate air as part of an HVAC system

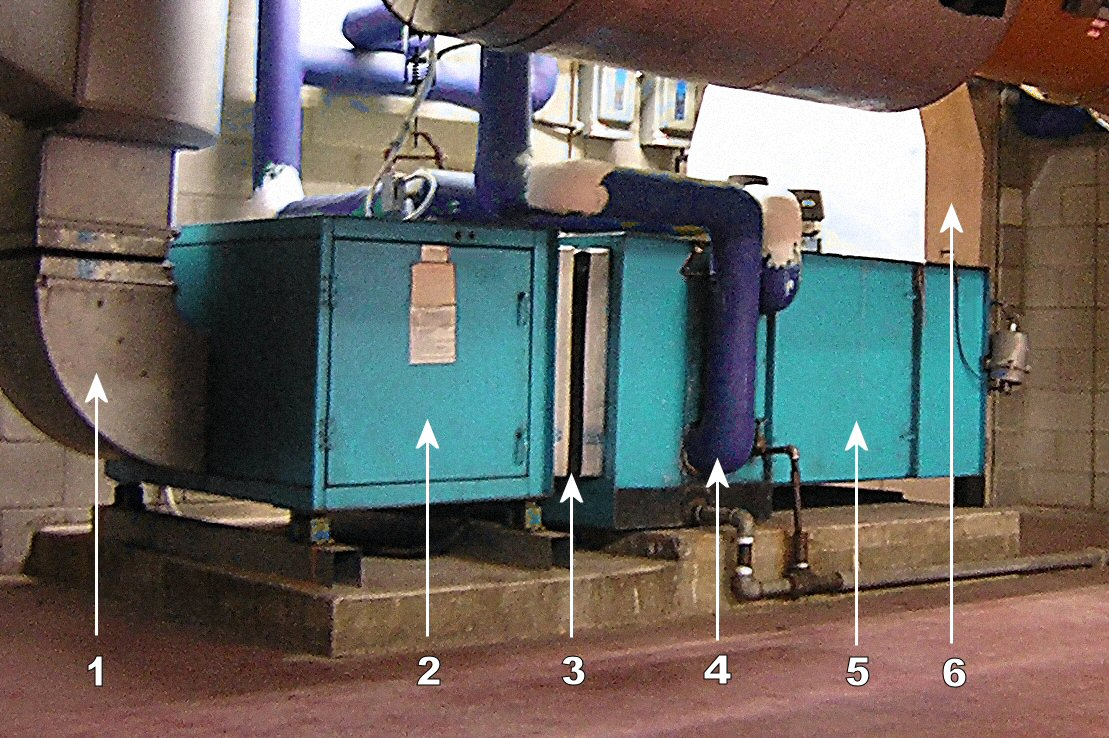
An air handling unit; air flow is from the right to left in this case. Some AHU components shown are 1 – Supply duct 2 – Fan compartment 3 – Vibration isolator ('flex joint') 4 – Heating and/or cooling coil 5 – Filter compartment 6 – Mixed (recirculated + outside) air duct

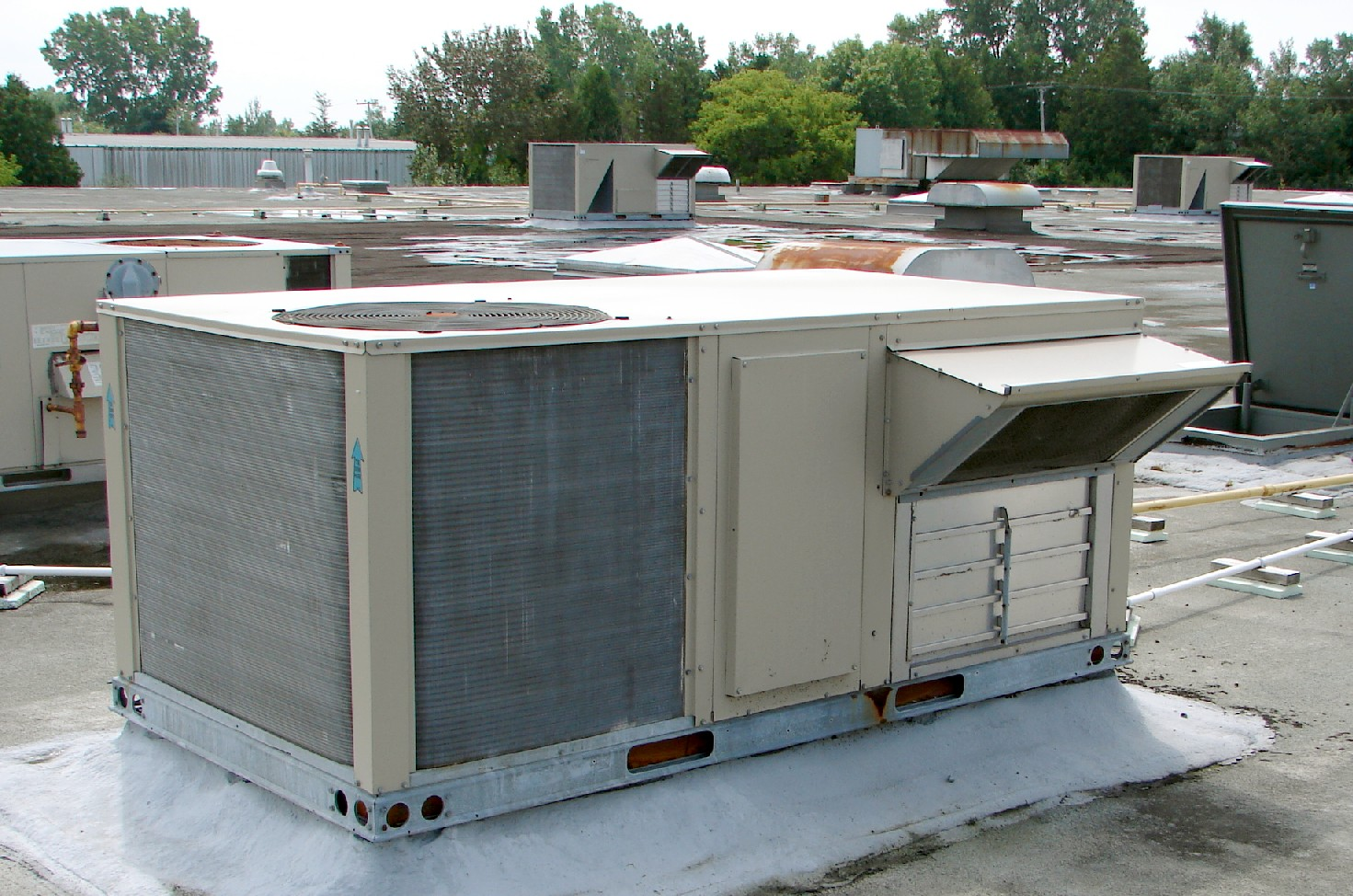
A rooftop packaged unit or RTU

An air handler, or air handling unit (often abbreviated to AHU), is a device used to regulate and circulate air as part of a heating, ventilating, and air-conditioning (HVAC) system. An air handler is usually a large metal box containing a blower, furnace or A/C elements, filter racks or chambers, sound attenuators, and dampers. Air handlers usually connect to a ductwork ventilation system that distributes the conditioned air through the building and returns it to the AHU, sometimes exhausting air to the atmosphere and bringing in fresh air. Sometimes AHUs discharge (supply) and admit (return) air directly to and from the space served without ductwork.

Small air handlers, for local use, are called terminal units, and may only include an air filter, coil, and blower/fan; these simple terminal units are called blower coils or fan coil units. A larger air handler that conditions 100% outside air, and no recirculated air, is known as a make-up air unit (MAU), make-up handling unit (MHU), or fresh air handling unit (FAHU). An air handler designed for outdoor use, typically on roofs, is known as a packaged unit (PU), heating and air conditioning unit (HCU), rooftop unit (RTU) or roof mounted packaged unit (RMPU).

== Construction ==
The air handler is normally constructed around a framing system with metal infill panels as required to suit the configuration of the components. In its simplest form the frame may be made from metal channels or sections, with single skin metal infill panels. The metalwork is normally galvanized for long term protection. For outdoor units some form of weatherproof lid and additional sealing around joints is provided.

Larger air handlers will be manufactured from a square section steel framing system with double skinned and insulated infill panels. Such constructions reduce heat loss or heat gain from the air handler, as well as providing acoustic attenuation. Larger air handlers may be several meters long and are manufactured in a sectional manner and therefore, for strength and rigidity, steel section base rails are provided under the unit.

Where supply and extract air is required in equal proportions for a balanced ventilation system, it is common for the supply and extract air handlers to be joined together, either in a side-by-side or a stacked configuration.

== Air handling unit types ==
There are six factors for air handlers classifications and determine types of them, based on:

1. Application (air handling unit usage)
2. Air flow control (CAV or VAV air handlers)
3. Zone control (single zone or multi zone air handlers)
4. Fan location (draw-through or blow-through)
5. Direction of outlet air flow (front, up, or down)
6. Package model (horizontal or vertical)

But, the first method is very common in the HVAC market. In fact, most of the company advertise their products by air handling unit applications:

1. Normal
2. Hygienic
3. Ceiling mounted

== Components ==
The major types of components are described here in approximate order, from the return duct (input to the AHU), through the unit, to the supply duct (AHU output).

=== Filters ===
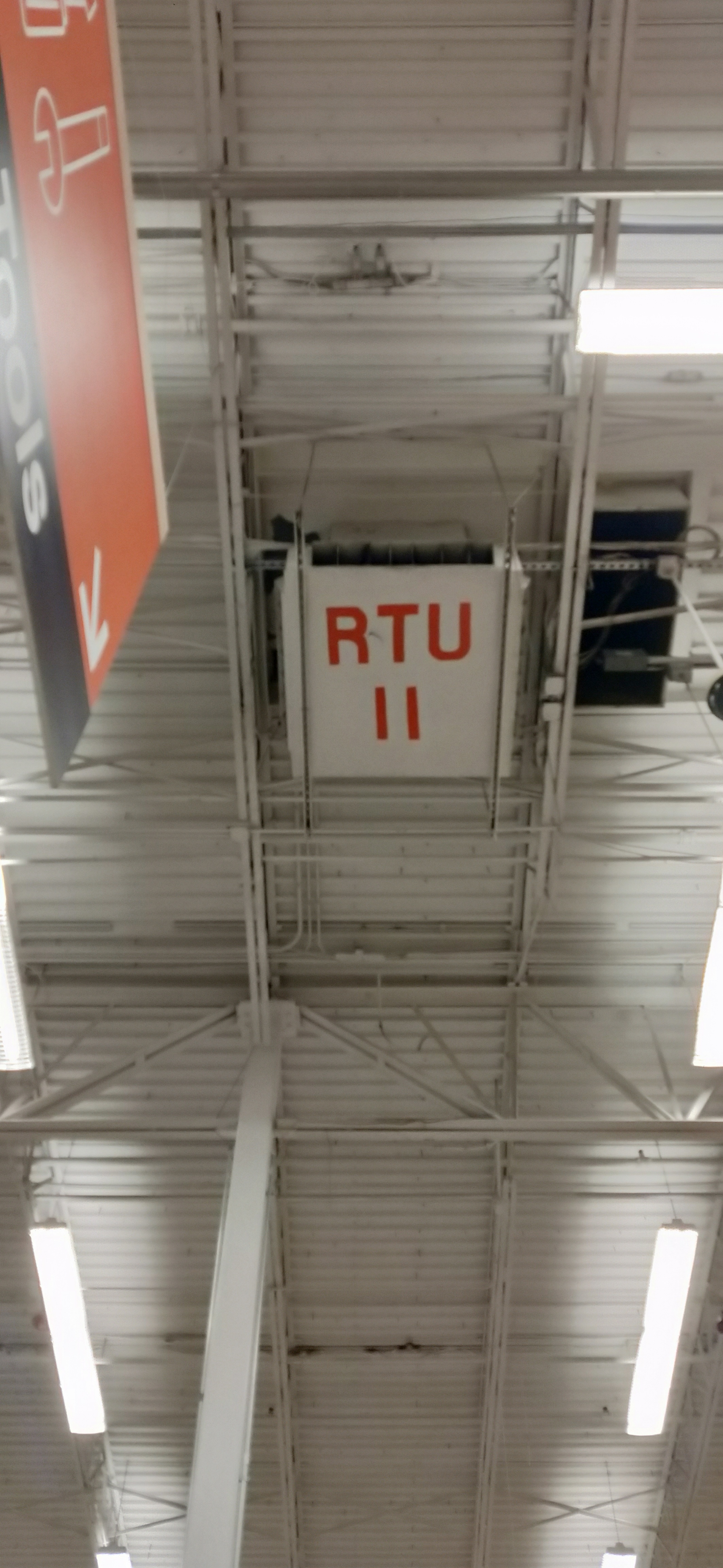
An RTU viewed from inside with supply diffusers and return vent (center right)

Air filtration is almost always present in order to provide clean dust-free air to the building occupants. It may be via simple low-MERV pleated media, HEPA, electrostatic, or a combination of techniques. Gas-phase and ultraviolet air treatments may be employed as well.

Filtration is typically placed first in the AHU in order to keep all the downstream components clean. Depending upon the grade of filtration required, typically filters will be arranged in two (or more) successive banks with a coarse-grade panel filter provided in front of a fine-grade bag filter, or other "final" filtration medium. The panel filter is cheaper to replace and maintain, and thus protects the more expensive bag filters.

The life of a filter may be assessed by monitoring the pressure drop through the filter medium at design air volume flow rate. This may be done by means of a visual display using a pressure gauge, or by a pressure switch linked to an alarm point on the building control system. Failure to replace a filter may eventually lead to its collapse, as the forces exerted upon it by the fan overcome its inherent strength, resulting in collapse and thus contamination of the air handler and downstream ductwork.

=== Hot (heat / furnace) and cold (air conditioning) elements ===
Air handlers may need to provide hot air, cold air, or both to change the supply air temperature, and humidity level depending on the location and the application. Such conditioning is provided by heat exchanger coils within the air handling unit air stream, and such coils may be direct or indirect in relation to the medium providing the heating or cooling effect.

Direct heat exchangers include those for gas-fired or fuel oil-burning heaters or a refrigeration evaporator, placed directly in the air stream. Electric resistance heaters and heat pumps can be used as well. Evaporative cooling is more practical in dry climates, especially if relative humidity is well below 50%.

Indirect coils use hot water or steam for heating, and chilled water or glycol for cooling (prime energy for heating and air conditioning is provided by central plant elsewhere in the building). Coils are typically manufactured from copper for the tubes, with copper or aluminum fins to aid heat transfer. Cooling coils will also employ eliminator plates to remove and drain condensate. The hot water or steam is provided by a central boiler, and the chilled water is provided by a central chiller. Downstream temperature sensors are typically used to monitor and control "off coil" temperatures, in conjunction with an appropriate motorized control valve prior to the coil.

If dehumidification is required, then the cooling coil is employed to over-cool so that the dew point is reached and condensation occurs. A heater coil placed after the cooling coil re-heats the air (therefore known as a re-heat coil) to the desired supply temperature. This process has the effect of reducing the relative humidity level of the supply air.

In colder climates, where winter temperatures regularly drop below freezing, then frost coils or pre-heat coils are often employed as a first stage of air treatment to ensure that downstream filters or chilled water coils are protected against freezing. The control of the frost coil is such that if a certain off-coil air temperature is not reached then the entire air handler is shut down for protection.

=== Humidifier ===
Humidification is often necessary in colder climates where continuous heating will make the air drier, resulting in uncomfortable air quality and increased static electricity. Various types of humidification may be used:

- Evaporative: dry air blown over a reservoir will evaporate some of the water. The rate of evaporation can be increased by spraying the water onto baffles in the air stream.
- Vaporizer: steam or vapor from a boiler is blown directly into the air stream.
- Spray mist: water is diffused either by a nozzle or other mechanical means into fine droplets and carried by the air.
- Ultrasonic: A tray of fresh water in the airstream is excited by an ultrasonic device forming a fog or water mist.
- Wetted medium: A fine fibrous medium in the airstream is kept moist with fresh water from a header pipe with a series of small outlets. As the air passes through the medium it entrains the water in fine droplets. This type of humidifier can quickly clog if the primary air filtration is not maintained in good order.

=== Mixing chamber ===
In order to maintain indoor air quality, air handlers commonly have provisions to allow the introduction of outside air into, and the exhausting of air from the building. In temperate climates, mixing the right amount of cooler outside air with warmer return air can be used to approach the desired supply air temperature. A mixing chamber is therefore used which has dampers controlling the ratio between the return, outside, and exhaust air.

=== Blower/fan ===
Air handlers typically employ a large squirrel cage blower driven by an AC induction electric motor to move the air. The blower may operate at a single speed, offer a variety of set speeds, or be driven by a variable-frequency drive to allow a wide range of air flow rates. Flow rate may also be controlled by inlet vanes or outlet dampers on the fan. Some air handlers including residential ones in the USA (central "furnaces" or "air conditioners") use a brushless DC electric motor that has variable speed capabilities. Air handlers in Europe and Australia and New Zealand now commonly use backward curve fans without scroll or "plug fans". These are driven using high efficiency EC (electronically commutated) motors with built in speed control. Several of these fans can be placed in a "fan wall" or fan array. The higher the RTU temperature, the slower the air will flow. And the lower the RTU temperature, the faster the air will flow.

Multiple blowers may be present in large commercial air handling units, typically placed at the end of the AHU and the beginning of the supply ductwork (therefore also called "supply fans"). They are often augmented by fans in the return air duct ("return fans") pushing the air into the AHU.

=== Balancing ===
Un-balanced fans wobble and vibrate. For home AC fans, this can be a major problem: air circulation is greatly reduced at the vents (as wobble is lost energy), efficiency is compromised, and noise is increased. Another major problem in fans that are not balanced is longevity of the bearings (attached to the fan and shaft) is compromised. This can cause failure to occur long before the bearings' life expectancy.

Weights can be strategically placed to correct for a smooth spin (for a ceiling fan, trial and error placement typically resolves the problem). Home/central AC fans or other big fans are typically taken to shops, which have special balancers for more complicated balancing (trial and error can cause damage before the correct points are found). The fan motor itself does not typically vibrate.

=== Heat recovery device ===
A heat recovery device heat exchanger may be fitted to the air handler between supply and extract airstreams for energy savings and increasing capacity. These types more commonly include for:

- Recuperator, or Plate Heat exchanger: A sandwich of plastic or metal plates with interlaced air paths. Heat is transferred between airstreams from one side of the plate to the other. The plates are typically spaced at 4 to 6 mm apart. Heat recovery efficiency up to 70%.
- Thermal wheel, or Rotary heat exchanger: A slowly rotating matrix of finely corrugated metal, operating in both opposing airstreams. When the air handling unit is in heating mode, heat is absorbed as air passes through the matrix in the exhaust airstream, during one half rotation, and released during the second half rotation into the supply airstream in a continuous process. When the air handling unit is in cooling mode, heat is released as air passes through the matrix in the exhaust airstream, during one half rotation, and absorbed during the second half rotation into the supply airstream. Heat recovery efficiency up to 85%. Wheels are also available with a hygroscopic coating to provide latent heat transfer and also the drying or humidification of airstreams.
- Run around coil: Two air to liquid heat exchanger coils, in opposing airstreams, piped together with a circulating pump and using water or a brine as the heat transfer medium. This device, although not very efficient, allows heat recovery between remote and sometimes multiple supply and exhaust airstreams. Heat recovery efficiency up to 50%.
- Heat pipe: Operating in both opposing air paths, using a confined refrigerant as a heat transfer medium. The heat pipe uses multiple sealed pipes mounted in a coil configuration with fins to increase heat transfer. Heat is absorbed on one side of the pipe, by evaporation of the refrigerant, and released at the other side, by condensation of the refrigerant. Condensed refrigerant flows by gravity to the first side of the pipe to repeat the process. Heat recovery efficiency up to 65%.

=== Controls ===
Controls are necessary to regulate every aspect of an air handler, such as: flow rate of air, supply air temperature, mixed air temperature, humidity, air quality. They may be as simple as an off/on thermostat or as complex as a building automation system using BACnet or LonWorks, for example.

Common control components include temperature sensors, humidity sensors, sail switches, actuators, motors, and controllers.

=== Vibration isolators ===
The blowers in an air handler can create substantial vibration and the large area of the duct system would transmit this noise and vibration to the occupants of the building. To avoid this, vibration isolators (flexible sections) are normally inserted into the duct immediately before and after the air handler and often also between the fan compartment and the rest of the AHU. The rubberized canvas-like material of these sections allows the air handler components to vibrate without transmitting this motion to the attached ducts.

The fan compartment can be further isolated by placing it on spring suspension, neoprene pads, or hung on spring hangers, which will mitigate the transfer of vibration through the structure.

=== Sound attenuators ===
The blower in the air handler also generates noise, which should be attenuated before ductwork enters a noise-sensitive room. To achieve meaningful noise reduction in a relatively short length, a sound attenuator is used. The attenuator is a specialty duct accessory that typically consists of an inner perforated baffle with sound-absorptive insulation. Sound attenuators may take the place of ductwork; conversely, inline attenuators are located close to the blower and have a bellmouth profile to minimize system effects.

== Major manufacturers ==
- AAON
- Carrier Corporation (also makes Bryant and Payne brands)
- CIAT Group
- Daikin Industries (also makes McQuay International, Goodman, and Airfel brands)
- Johnson Controls (also makes York International brand)
- Lennox International
- Rheem (also makes Ruud)
- Trane
- Vertiv

== See also ==
- HVAC
- Indoor air quality
- Thermal comfort
