= ASHRAE Handbook =

Heating, refrigerating and air-Conditioning engineering handbook

The ASHRAE Handbook is the four-volume flagship publication of the nonprofit technical organization ASHRAE (American Society of Heating, Refrigerating and Air-Conditioning Engineers (Note: About its name, ASHRAE says the following: 'In 2012, as part of a rebranding, ASHRAE began doing business as “ASHRAE” vs. using its full legal name of the American Society of Heating, Refrigerating and Air-Conditioning Engineers. Use of ASHRAE reflects the Society’s worldwide membership and that services will continue evolving globally.')). This Handbook is considered the most comprehensive and authoritative repository of practical knowledge on the various topics that form the field of heating, ventilation, air-conditioning, and refrigeration (HVAC&R). (Note: Here is how some other sources have characterized the Handbook: 'The four-volume ASHRAE Handbook... provides the most comprehensive and authoritative reference on HVAC systems for buildings.' 'ASHRAE HANDBOOK & Product Directory... has been known as the “Bible" of the industry for over fifty years.' 'The standard method for determining heat losses from a structure, at least in the United States, is to consult the bible for heat flow calculations — the ASHRAE Fundamentals.' 'It is rare to use the analysis just presented to determine the heat loss through glass. Instead, the empirically based tables and formulae given in the ASHRAE Fundamentals are most often consulted.' 'The definitive works on the thermal resistance of air spaces can be found in ASHRAE Fundamentals.' 'The heat loss through a window is commonly determined from the conductance of that window, and the authority for this, at least in the United States, is ASHRAE Fundamentals.' 'ASHRAE is a leading authority on heat and moisture transfer, and air infiltration in a structure. Its Handbook of Fundamentals is considered by many to be the best source of technical information.')

The four volumes are Fundamentals, Refrigeration, HVAC Applications ("Applications"), and HVAC Systems and Equipment ("Systems and Equipment"). Members of ASHRAE receive the current volume, in both print and CD-ROM form, each year as a basic membership benefit. An enhanced electronic version, known as ASHRAE Handbook Online is a web-based version updated annually that contains the four latest volumes as well as extra content such as calculations, demonstration videos, and spreadsheets. The various versions of the Handbook are typically available to the public via technical, and other, libraries and bookstores.

== History ==
The ASHRAE Handbook has had a variety of titles. It began in 1922 as the ASH&VE Guide. In 1973 it became the ASHRAE Handbook, and in 1985 separate publication of inch-pound (I-P) and international system (SI) units versions of the volumes began. The current publisher of record is W. Stephen Comstock, and the Editor is Mark S. Owen. The Handbook is published by ASHRAE from its headquarters in Atlanta, Georgia.

== Review and Revision ==
The Handbook's content is created and modified by volunteers via ASHRAE's many Technical Committees (TCs), and then edited and formatted by professional staff at ASHRAE. For example, three chapters, in three different volumes, are maintained by TC 5.3, Room Air Distribution. Each chapter within a particular volume is reviewed and revised in a repeating four-year cycle; one volume is printed each year. In the summer of 2017 the new Fundamentals' volume was released. ASHRAE's Handbook Committee maintains an Authors and Revisers Guide, which can be obtained freely via the Handbook portion of the ASHRAE Web site.

While each new or revised chapter manuscript is to be reviewed for technical content by each TC voting and corresponding member before publication, there are often many other pre- and post-publication reviewers. For example, members of the Society's Handbook Committee and the College of Fellows review chapters each year. Reviews, from basic comments to detailed new content, are encouraged from all users of the Handbook and may be submitted through an online commenting system.
