= Electric vehicle charging infrastructure security =

Electric vehicle charging infrastructure's security concerns the protection, against cyber and physical threats, of the electric vehicle charging infrastructure (EVCI or EVI), the critical infrastructure of structures, machinery, and equipment necessary to support electric vehicles (EVs). As a cyber-physical system, the EVCI is composed of an operational technology (OT) and an information technology (IT) layer. The OT layer relies on the smart grid to deliver power and offer flexibility services such as vehicle-to-grid (V2G) and demand response. The IT layer handles charge management, authentication, payment, and roaming services, often communicating through protocols such as the Open Charge Point Protocol (OCPP) between charging stations and management systems, and the ISO 15118 standard for communication between the vehicle and the charging station.

Because EVCI is considered a critical infrastructure, it is regulated as such under several frameworks. In the European Union, EV charging infrastructure operators are explicitly designated as an energy sub-sector under the NIS2 Directive, with physical resilience obligations covered by the companion Critical Entities Resilience (CER) Directive, and product-level cybersecurity requirements introduced for connected chargers by the Cyber Resilience Act. In the United States, federally funded charging stations must comply with the cybersecurity strategies mandated by the National Electric Vehicle Infrastructure (NEVI) Formula Program minimum standards. Consequently, EVCI is exposed to a wide array of threats ranging from individual attackers and cybercriminals to nation-state adversaries. Identified attack vectors target the charging stations themselves, the communication protocols, the back-end management systems, and the interface with the power grid, with potential consequences including disruption of charging services, fraud, theft of user data, and instability of the electrical grid.

== Stakeholders and system architecture ==
Electric vehicle charging infrastructure's general architecture. Black lines represent data communications, and yellow lines represent power lines.

The EVCI is operated not by a single entity but by an ecosystem of interacting stakeholders, which the academic and standards literature describes through a division of roles. The charge point operator (CPO) installs, operates, and maintains the physical charging stations and runs the charge point management system (CPMS) through which they are monitored and controlled. The e-mobility service provider (eMSP) acts as the interface between the driver and the service, providing access through apps, RFID cards, or Plug and Charge, and handling authentication, billing, and support. A roaming hub sits between the two, acting as a clearing platform so that a driver registered with one eMSP can charge on a CPO's network without a separate contract, while the charge point owner finances the infrastructure and may delegate its operation entirely. On the energy side, the distribution system operator (DSO) owns the distribution network from which the CPO draws power and to which it remits payment for the electricity consumed. These actors often interoperate through open protocols across different communication channels:

- ISO 15118 is the most common protocol between the EV and the charger. It defines the high-level digital communication between the vehicle and the charging station, enabling automated authentication and billing (the Plug and Charge feature), smart charging, and bidirectional power transfer such as vehicle-to-grid (V2G). Communication can be secured with TLS, which is mandatory for Plug and Charge and relies on a vehicle-to-grid public key infrastructure (V2G-PKI).
- OCPP is the main protocol for the communication between the chargers and the CPMS.
- Open Charge Point Interface (OCPI) is the principal solution for roaming exchanges between CPOs and eMSPs. Open Clearing House Protocol (OCHP) and Open Intercharge protocol (OICP) are the main alternatives.
- OpenADR, IEEE 2030.5, and IEC 61850 are the principal protocols for grid-facing communication, carrying demand-response signals and flexibility services between the grid operators (DSO, TSO, utility) and the CPO or charging stations, so that charging can be shifted or curtailed according to grid conditions.

Although the literature presents these roles as cleanly separated, the deployed infrastructure rarely matches that picture: a single company frequently combines several roles at once (for example, a CPO commonly acting as its own eMSP) and the CPO function itself is assumed by a wide range of actors, from logistics providers and fuel-station chains to energy companies and municipalities. While this flexibility helped sustain the pace of EV deployment, it now creates security concerns: the high co-dependence between system components makes lateral movement easy, and the absence of standardization hinders the use of common security measures.

== IT security ==
The IT layer comprises the back-end and cloud systems that manage charging rather than deliver power: the CPMS, the eMSP platforms, the roaming hubs, the payment and authentication systems, and the mobile applications and public APIs through which drivers and third parties interact with the service. Because this layer carries identity, billing, and personal data, its security objectives are dominated by confidentiality and integrity, and its assets are exposed to the same classes of threat as any networked information system.

=== EVCS-CPMS communication ===
The communication between a charging station and its management system, carried by OCPP, is the most studied interface of the IT layer, and its security depends strongly on the protocol version and the transport binding in use. The widely deployed OCPP 1.6 (2015) is offered over two bindings (a legacy SOAP/XML binding and a JSON-over-WebSocket binding known as 1.6J, the latter now dominant), but its base specification contains no security provisions. These were added only afterwards through the Open Charge Alliance Improved security for OCPP 1.6 white paper, which defines three optional security profiles:

1. Profile 1: HTTP Basic authentication over an unencrypted WebSocket.
2. Profile 2: a server-side certificate combined with Basic authentication over TLS.
3. Profile 3: mutual TLS in which both endpoints authenticate with certificates.

OCPP 2.0.1 (2020) folds these profiles into the core specification and treats security as a first-class concern rather than an optional extension.

Because the OCPP 1.6 base specification leaves security optional, many 1.6 and 1.6J deployments run under Profile 1 or plain WebSocket transport, exchanging data (billing records, authentication tokens, and control commands alike) in clear text. This exposes them to eavesdropping, man-in-the-middle interception, message tampering, replay, and session hijacking, while the HTTP basic credentials themselves can be captured and reused. The application layer offers no message-authenticity guarantee, so an attacker on the channel could forge management commands or redirect the station to a malicious firmware image.

At the protocol level, OCPP 2.0.1 addresses the main shortcomings of 1.6:

Security-relevant differences between OCPP 1.6(J) and OCPP 2.0.1
Aspect	OCPP 1.6(J)	OCPP 2.0.1
Security in the specification	Optional, added by a separate white paper	Native part of the core specification
Transport encryption	None by default	TLS 1.2+ mandatory for Profiles 2–3
Authentication	HTTP Basic (Profile 1)	Basic (Profile 2) or mutual-TLS client certificates (Profile 3)
Firmware updates	Unsigned	Cryptographically signed, with signature verification
Certificate and key management	Not defined	Install, update, and delete certificate messages with key management
Security logging	None	SecurityEventNotification and a dedicated security event log
ISO 15118 / Plug and Charge certificates	Not supported	Natively handled

These improvements are not a complete solution. For backward compatibility, the insecure Profile 1 remains permitted, so misconfiguration or a protocol downgrade can still leave traffic unencrypted, and TLS alone does not remove the residual exposure from weak certificate validation or from untrusted intermediate nodes in the roaming chain. Transport security protects the channel but not the truthfulness of the data placed on it: OCPP 2.0.1 back-ends are shown to retain weaknesses such as single-factor authentication based only on the charging-station identifier, weak session management, and the absence of rate limiting, independently of the transport layer. A compromised or spoofed charging station, or a malicious back-end, can therefore mount a false data injection attack (FDIA), reporting fabricated meter values or status notifications that the management system accepts as genuine. Because the CPMS drives smart-charging setpoints from these reports, coordinated false data across many stations can be escalated into a load-altering attack (LAA) on the distribution grid, forming a cross-layer path from the IT interface to the physical power system. The principal countermeasures are therefore to enforce Profile 3 mutual TLS and disable Profile 1, to validate certificates against a managed public key infrastructure, and to complement transport security with application-layer defences: per-device strong authentication beyond the station identifier, request rate limiting, plausibility checks and anomaly detection on reported measurands, and dedicated power-system messaging-security standards such as IEC 62351.

=== Cloud management systems ===
Beyond the protocol itself, charging-management systems are shown to carry systemic weaknesses, rooted in weak single-factor authentication based only on the charging-station identifier, inadequate session management, and the absence of rate limiting on back-end communications. These weaknesses enable man-in-the-middle attacks, denial of service, firmware theft, and data poisoning. Comparable flaws have appeared in deployed products, including WebSocket authentication bypasses that allow attackers to impersonate charging stations, issue commands, and hijack sessions. The recommended countermeasures center on strict mutual device authentication beyond the station identifier, secure session management, request rate limiting, comprehensive logging, and managed firmware and software updates.

=== Firmware and software supply chain ===
Charging stations run vendor-supplied firmware and embedded software that is typically updated remotely through the back-end using the OCPP firmware-update messages, which makes firmware integrity as much a back-end and supply-chain concern as a device one. An attacker who compromises the back-end can push a malicious or backdoored image to the whole fleet. Where the channel itself is unsecured (as under OCPP 1.6, whose firmware updates are unsigned), an attacker positioned only on a single station's transport link can likewise tamper with that station's update alone. Conversely, firmware extracted from a station can be reverse-engineered to recover hard-coded keys, credentials, or protocol secrets and to craft further attacks, linking firmware theft directly to the data-poisoning and impersonation risks seen at the back-end layer.

The risk is amplified in the supply chain: many operators deploy hardware, OCPP stacks, and back-end software from a small number of vendors and shared open-source components. Because of this, a single upstream vulnerability can propagate across large parts of the installed base, as illustrated by the high-severity flaws found in a widely reused charging back-end. In the European Union, the Cyber Resilience Act responds to supply-chain risks by imposing measures such as secure update mechanisms, vulnerability handling, and software bill of materials (SBOM). The principal countermeasures are cryptographically signed firmware verified by an on-device root of trust, secure over-the-air update infrastructure with rollback protection, maintenance of an SBOM with active vulnerability monitoring and patch management, vetting of third-party components and vendor build pipelines, and the avoidance of hard-coded secrets.

=== Identity, payment, and roaming services ===
The driver-facing services (authentication, billing, and roaming) concentrate the personal and financial data of the system and are correspondingly attractive targets for fraud, account takeover, and privacy compromise. The most common attack vector in this case is quishing (QR-code phishing), in which attackers affix fake QR-code stickers to public charging stations to redirect users to malicious payment pages that harvest card details or app credentials. The risk is amplified by the roaming chain, in which session and billing records pass through several intermediary platforms. Mitigations include end-to-end protection of billing data, multi-factor authentication, and robust identity and access management. Quishing in particular is hard to counter, but some measures can reduce its impact, such as confining payment to the operator's verified app or website and applying tamper-evident labelling to on-station QR codes.

== OT security ==
The OT layer comprises the physical and energy-delivery components of the infrastructure: the electric vehicle supply equipment (EVSE) with its power electronics and controllers, the connectors between the EVSE and the vehicle, and the grid-facing connection to the distribution system operator. Unlike the IT layer, where confidentiality is the most important requirement, OT security goals are mostly safety, availability, and physical integrity, because a compromise can damage hardware, endanger users, or destabilise the electrical grid rather than merely expose data.

=== Vehicle–charger interface ===
Protocol stack for EV–EVSE communication under CCS/ISO 15118. The ISO 15118 high-level communication (HLC) rides HomePlug Green PHY power-line communication on the Control Pilot line, while IEC 61851-1 basic signaling (PWM) shares the same physical conductors.

The communication between the EV and the charger spans several layers: the low-level analogue control signalling defined by IEC 61851 over the Control Pilot line, and, above it, the high-level digital communication of ISO 15118 carried by power-line communication (PLC, HomePlug Green PHY) over the same Combined Charging System (CCS) wires. This layered medium makes the interface an entry point for attacks that manipulate the charging session, spoof a Plug and Charge identity, or target the vehicle-to-grid public key infrastructure (V2G-PKI) on which automated authentication depends.

At the link layer, the initial pairing between vehicle and station, known as Signal Level Attenuation Characterization (SLAC), is unauthenticated, and the PLC signal is not confined to the charging cable: through conducted and radiated emissions it leaks into the surroundings, so a nearby adversary can passively eavesdrop on the exchange or actively inject messages without a physical tap. This enables session eavesdropping, association hijacking, and the recovery of identifiers that can be used to track vehicles.

The strength of the authentication guarantees depends heavily on the ISO 15118 version in use. ISO 15118-2 (2014) protects the channel with unilateral TLS (only the charging station is authenticated to the vehicle) and mandates TLS only for Plug and Charge, leaving other sessions and the external identification means (EIM) fallback exposed; its handling of application-layer contract certificates also complicates validation and revocation across the V2G-PKI. ISO 15118-20 (2022) strengthens this with mutual TLS and modern cipher suites, but the older version remains widely fielded and a session can often be downgraded to unauthenticated EIM.

The shared PLC medium is also a denial-of-service target: CCS charging sessions are shown to be abortable wirelessly, from tens of meters away, using a low-power electromagnetic signal (the Brokenwire attack), disrupting many vehicles at once without prior pairing or physical access.

In deployed CCS charging, these theoretical weaknesses are compounded in practice by inconsistent implementation across operators: absent or misconfigured TLS, limited Plug and Charge adoption with frequent fallback to unauthenticated identification, and uneven certificate handling. The primary countermeasures are therefore migration to ISO 15118-20 with enforced mutual TLS, rigorous V2G-PKI certificate management (validation, rotation, and revocation), shielded cabling to limit signal emanation, and physical-layer anti-jamming or anomaly detection to counter emission-based eavesdropping and disruption.

=== Charging-station hardware ===
The physical charging station is exposed to local tampering and to attacks through exposed maintenance and debug interfaces (service ports, USB, or JTAG) that can grant direct access to its controllers, stored secrets, and firmware. Countermeasures follow established embedded-systems practice: a hardware root of trust enforcing verified (secure) boot, tamper-resistant and tamper-evident enclosures, protection of on-device credentials, and the hardening or disabling of local interfaces. Because a compromised device connects directly to the firmware and supply-chain risks handled at the IT layer, hardware and software defenses have to be combined.

=== Grid-facing communication ===
The connection between charging infrastructure and the grid is carried by demand-response and distributed-energy-resource protocols such as OpenADR, IEEE 2030.5, and IEC 61850, which convey the signals that shift or curtail charging according to grid conditions. Because a single demand-response command can start, stop, or rescale a large amount of charging load at once, the integrity and authenticity of this channel are critical: an adversary who forges or replays demand-response signals, or tampers with their configuration, can drive charging in the wrong direction across many stations simultaneously. Countermeasures are authenticating and validating the demand-response signals, hardening the protocol configuration, and applying dedicated power-system messaging-security standards such as IEC 62351.

=== Demand-manipulation attacks ===
Because charging stations are high-wattage, remotely controllable loads that increasingly participate in demand response and grid-flexibility programmes, an adversary able to influence how and when they draw power can manipulate aggregate demand to harm the grid. What makes these demand-manipulation attacks distinct is that their impact scales with the number of chargers under control rather than with any single device, so the decisive attack surface is whatever can command them at scale: the back-end or CPMS, the demand-response channel, injected false telemetry, or the driver-facing mobile applications and roaming aggregators, whose compromise can marshal many vehicles at once without touching an individual station.

A prominent form of demand-manipulation attack is the load-altering attack (LAA), a general class of grid attack in which many controllable loads are switched together to force sudden swings in aggregate consumption that push grid frequency and voltage outside safe limits. EV charging is simply one high-wattage, aggregable load that can be marshalled to this end, a use also captured by the manipulation-of-demand-via-IoT (MadIoT) model of high-wattage IoT botnets. Controlling on the order of a few thousand vehicles in a dense urban grid is estimated to be sufficient to trigger instability and blackouts, with the non-linear reactive-power demand of fast charging amplifying the effect. Beyond grid instability, sustained or repeated manipulation of charging demand can also stress distribution assets and distort the flexibility and energy-market signals that demand-response programmes rely on.

Grid-side defenses include limiting the rate of aggregated load changes, dispersing controllable load, validating demand-response participation, and anomaly detection able to recognise coordinated demand manipulation.

== Cross-layer propagation and defence in depth ==
Because the IT and OT layers are interconnected, they cannot be secured in isolation. Several concrete cross-layer paths recur through the preceding sections: false data injected at the OCPP interface can escalate into a load-altering attack on the grid, firmware distributed through the back-end can compromise physical stations, and driver-facing applications can be used to marshal many chargers against the distribution network. Conversely, a physically compromised charger or manipulated EV–EVSE communication can feed false state back up into the IT layer. The literature consequently concludes that no single IT, OT, or physical-layer measure is sufficient on its own, and recommends a defence-in-depth architecture combining segmentation of IT and OT networks, intrusion and anomaly detection on both, and adherence to dedicated standards such as IEC 62443 for industrial control security and the NIST/NCCoE framework profile for extreme fast charging.

== Notable incidents ==
Notable incidents include:

- In February 2022, charging stations along Russia's M11 motorway between Moscow and Saint Petersburg were disabled and made to display anti-war and pro-Ukraine messages; the stations contained components from a Ukrainian supplier that reportedly included a remotely triggered backdoor, an instance of supply-chain compromise.
- In April 2022, public chargers operated by the Isle of Wight Council in the United Kingdom had their display screens hijacked to show a pornographic website after a third-party feed behind the screens was compromised.
- In January 2024 at the Pwn2Own Automotive in Tokyo, security researchers demonstrated working exploits against several commercial chargers, including models from ChargePoint, Autel, JuiceBox, Emporia, and Phoenix Contact, in a competition that treated EV charging equipment as a first-class target.
- In February 2026, a cluster of high-severity vulnerabilities in a widely used charging back-end (CVE-2026-27028), including a WebSocket authentication bypass, was disclosed, allowing station impersonation, command injection, and session hijacking.

== See also ==
- Critical infrastructure protection
- Electric vehicle charging network
- Open Charge Point Protocol
- Smart grid
- Vehicle-to-grid
