= IEC 62351 =

Cyber security in power management systems

IEC 62351 is a standard developed by WG15 of IEC TC57. This is developed for handling the security of TC 57 series of protocols including IEC 60870-5 series, IEC 60870-6 series, IEC 61850 series, IEC 61970 series & IEC 61968 series. The different security objectives include authentication of data transfer through digital signatures, ensuring only authenticated access, prevention of eavesdropping, prevention of playback and spoofing, and intrusion detection.

== Standard details ==
- IEC 62351-1 — Introduction to the standard
- IEC 62351-2 — Glossary of terms
- IEC 62351-3 Ed. 2 — Security for any profiles including TCP/IP. Current edition was published 06/2023, replacing edition 1.2.
  - TLS Encryption
  - Node Authentication by means of X.509 certificates
  - Message Authentication
- IEC 62351-4 — Security for any profiles including MMS (e.g., ICCP-based IEC 60870-6, IEC 61850, etc.).
  - Authentication for MMS
  - TLS (RFC 2246)is inserted between RFC 1006 & RFC 793 to provide transport layer security
- IEC 62351-5 — Security for any profiles including IEC 60870-5 (e.g., DNP3 derivative)
  - TLS for TCP/IP profiles and encryption for serial profiles.
- IEC 62351-6 — Security for IEC 61850 profiles.
  - VLAN use is made as mandatory for GOOSE
  - RFC 2030 to be used for SNTP
- IEC 62351-7 — Security through network and system management.
  - Defines Management Information Base (MIBs) that are specific for the power industry, to handle network and system management through SNMP based methods.
- IEC 62351-8 — Role-based access control.
  - Covers the access control of users and automated agents to data objects in power systems by means of role-based access control (RBAC).
- IEC 62351-9 — Key Management
  - Describes the correct and safe usage of safety-critical parameters, e.g. passwords, encryption keys.
  - Covers the whole life cycle of cryptographic information (enrollment, creation, distribution, installation, usage, storage and removal).
  - Methods for algorithms using asymmetric cryptography
    - Handling of digital certificates (public / private key)
    - Setup of the PKI environment with X.509 certificates
    - Certificate enrollment by means of SCEP / EST, while allowing the use of other enrollment protocols
    - Certificate revocation by means of CRL / OCSP
  - A secure distribution mechanism based on GDOI and the IKEv1 protocol is presented for the usage of symmetric keys, e.g. session keys.
- IEC 62351-10 — Security Architecture
  - Explanation of security architectures for the entire IT infrastructure
  - Identifying critical points of the communication architecture, e.g. substation control center, substation automation
  - Appropriate mechanisms security requirements, e.g. data encryption, user authentication
  - Applicability of well-proven standards from the IT domain, e.g. VPN tunnel, secure FTP, HTTPS
- IEC 62351-11 — Security for XML Files
  - Embedding of the original XML content into an XML container
  - Date of issue and access control for XML data
  - X.509 signature for authenticity of XML data
  - Optional data encryption

== See also ==
- IEC TC 57
- List of IEC technical committees
