= C2A Security =

Israeli automotive cybersecurity and DevSecOps company

- Type: Private
- Industry: Cybersecurity, DevSecOps
- Founded: 2016
- Founder: Michael Dick
- Headquarters: Jerusalem, Israel
- Key people: Roy Fridman (chief executive officer)
- Products: EVSec
- Website: c2a-sec.com

C2A Security is an Israeli company that develops cybersecurity and DevSecOps software and is headquartered in Jerusalem.

== History ==
C2A Security was founded in 2016 by Michael Dick, who previously co-founded conditional access company NDS Group, and began by developing in-vehicle cybersecurity tools. In 2018, C2A launched AutoArmor to protect automobiles from hackers.

In February 2019, C2A received $6.5 million investment in a Series A financing round led by Maniv Mobility and Israel Cleantech Ventures. In the same year, C2A began a joint initiative with NXP Semiconductors on hardening CAN bus communications.

In 2023, C2A expanded its operations and opened new offices in the RAD Tower at Har Hotzvim. In October 2023, it was selected for the European Prize for Mobility.

In October 2025, C2A acquired United States firm Vigilant Ops, a specialist in SBOM automation for medical devices.

== Operations ==
C2A is based in Jerusalem. It develops a risk-driven DevSecOps and product security platform, EVSec, focused on regulatory compliance and lifecycle security for software-defined vehicles. The platform is used by Daimler Truck under a global enterprise agreement, with planned deployment across the company's truck and bus brands, and is designed to support Cyber Security Management System requirements under United Nations vehicle cybersecurity regulations. Other users include BMW, Marelli, NTT Data, Siemens and Valeo. In September 2024, Mitsubishi Motors selected C2A's EVSec to manage cybersecurity processes for its vehicles.
