= IEC 61850 =

International communication protocol standard

- Communication networks and systems for power utility automation
- Status: Published
- First published: April 28, 2003
- Latest version: Edition 2 March 14, 2013
- Organization: International Electrotechnical Commission
- Committee: Technical Committee 57
- Editors: Technical Committee 57
- Authors: Technical Committee 57
- Base standards: ISO 9506, ISO 8802, IEC 60870, IEC 61400, IEC 62351, IEC 81346, ISO 9001, RFC 2246,
- Related standards: IEC 62443
- Domain: Automation, Electrical engineering
- Website: iec61850.dvl.iec.ch

IEC 61850 is an international standard defining communication protocols for intelligent electronic devices at electrical substations. It is a part of the International Electrotechnical Commission's (IEC) Technical Committee 57 reference architecture for electric power systems. The abstract data models defined in IEC 61850 can be mapped to a number of protocols. Current mappings in the standard are to Manufacturing Message Specification (MMS), Generic Object Oriented Substation Event (GOOSE) [see section 3, Terms and definitions, term 3.65 on page 14], SV (Sampled Values) or SMV (Sampled Measure Values), and so on to web services. In the previous version of the standard, GOOSE stood for "Generic Object Oriented Substation Event", but this old definition is still very common in IEC 61850 documentation.

== See also ==
- Conformance testing – Type of testing for standards, contracts and regulations
- DNP3 – Computer network protocol
- Generic Substation Events – Communications method used in power grids
- IEC 60870-5-104 – Telecontrol standard
- IEC/IEEE 61850-9-3 – International standard for time synchronisation
- IEC 61968 – Series of communication protocol standards
- IEC 61970 – IEC standard
- Precision Time Protocol – Network time synchronization protocol
- Substation Configuration Language – Format for configuration of electrical substations
