= Kirill Shikhaev =

Russian scientist

Kirill Nikolaevich Shikhaev (born 1925) is a Soviet and Russian scientist. Professor, Doctor of technical sciences, academician of International Informatization Academy. With a team of mathematicians, he worked over the calculation of flight trajectory to Mars. He also participated in creating the main trajectory of launching the first space vehicles into orbit.

He held the positions of Director of Scientific Research Centre for Control Systems, director of Scientific Research Center for Economics and Complex Communication Problems. Under his leadership, Industrial Control System (ICS) was made, which is now responsible for everything from subway trains to military defense systems.

For a number of years directed advisory council of Higher Attestation Commission, in the section of control systems and computer science. He was a chief designer of control systems in the ministries of the military-industrial complex, a design project leader of special-purpose system “Almaz” of the Soviet gosplan (the USSR State Planning Committee).

== Contribution to arithmetic ==
Shikhaev's main studies are dedicated to the theory of numbers. He is the author of the new arithmetic of second order differences, where main theses of arithmetic in the theory of numbers obtain development and new solving methods, due to introduction into the "classical" basis of these subjects of the second order difference.

Shikhaev created the mathematical apparatus and research methods of number systems. He solved one of arithmetical problems, namely, he obtained virtually unlimited connection between traditional arithmetic operations, which made it possible to obtain new efficient methods of problem research in the theory of numbers.

== Research works and inventions ==
Shikhaev is the author of over 100 research papers and inventions, of which the main are dedicated to the theory of differences. Among the main works are the following: "New arithmetic of second order differences", "Introduction to the theory of different algorithms of parallel computational processes", Different algorithms of parallel computational processes", "Differential model of the theory of numbers" etc.

== Shikhaev–Anokhin method ==
The mathematical works known as “Shikhaev–Anokhin method” was patented as a teaching method for solving algebraic equations by numerical simulation.

== Awards ==
- Order of the October Revolution
- Order of the Patriotic War
- USSR State Prize
- USSR Council of Ministers Prize
- Academician I.I. Yuzvishin International Prize
- (With V. Anokhin) Prince of Asturias Award in the category "Technical and scientific research", for the "Shikhaev–Anokhin method".
