= Substation Configuration Language =

Format for configuration of electrical substations

System Configuration description Language formerly known as Substation Configuration description Language (SCL) is the language and representation format specified by IEC 61850 for the configuration of electrical substation devices. This includes representation of modeled data and communication services specified by IEC 61850–7-X standard documents. The complete SCL representation and its details are specified in IEC 61850-6 standard document. It includes data representation for substation device entities; its associated functions represented as logical nodes, communication systems and capabilities. The complete representation of data as SCL enhances the different devices of a substation to exchange the SCL files and to have a complete interoperability.

== Parts of SCL files ==
An SCL file contains the following parts:

Header
This part is used to identify version and other basic details of an SCL configuration file.
Substation
This is the part dealing with the different entities of a substation including various devices, interconnections and other functionalities. The elements include power transformers, Voltage Levels, bays, General Equipment, conducting equipment like breakers. From the Substation part logical nodes that represent functionality related to the object in the Substation are referred.
Communication
This section deals with different communication points (access points) for accessing the different IEDs of the complete system. This part contains different Sub Networks and access points.
IED
The IED section describes the complete configuration of an Intelligent Electronic Device (IED). It contains different access points of the specific IED, the logical devices, and logical nodes, report control blocks etc. coming under the IED. It describes what data an IED publish as reports and as Generic Substation Events (GSE; divided into GOOSE and GSSE) and what GOOSE/GSSE data from other IEDs an IED is configured to receive.
DataTypeTemplates
It defines different logical devices, logical nodes, data and other details separated into different instances. The complete data modeling according to IEC 61850-7-3 & 7-4 are represented in this part of SCL. It is again subdivided into LNodeType, DOType, DAType and EnumType.

== Types of SCL files ==
Depending on the purpose of SCL file, it is classified into the following types:

IED Capability Description (ICD) file
It defines complete capability of an IED. This file needs to be supplied by each manufacturer to make the complete system configuration. The file contains a single IED section, an optional communication section and an optional substation part which denotes the physical entities corresponding to the IED.
System Specification Description (SSD) file
This file contains complete specification of a substation automation system including single line diagram for the substation and its functionalities (logical nodes). This will have Substation part, Data type templates and logical node type definitions but need not have IED section.
Substation Configuration Description (SCD) file
This is the file describing complete substation detail. It contains substation, communication, IED and Data type template sections. An .SSD file and different .ICD files contribute in making an SCD file.
Configured IED Description (CID) file
It is a file used to have communication between an IED configuration tool to an IED. It can be considered as an SCD file stripped down to what the concerned IED need to know and contains a mandatory communication section of the addressed IED.
Instantiated IED Description (IID) file
It defines the configuration of one IED for a project and is used as data exchange format from the IED configurator to the system configurator. This file contains only the data for the IED being configured: one IED section, the communication section with the IED's communication parameters, the IED's data type templates, and, optionally, a substation section with the binding of functions (LNodes) to the single line diagram.
System Exchange Description (SED) file
This file is to be exchanged between system configurators of different projects. It describes the interfaces of one project to be used by another project, and at re-import the additionally engineered interface connections between the projects. It is a subset of an SCD file with additional engineering rights for each IED as well as the ownership (project) of SCL data.

The last two file types were introduced with Edition 2.

== See also ==
- Common Information Model (electricity)
