= Intelligent electronic device =

Controller of power system equipment

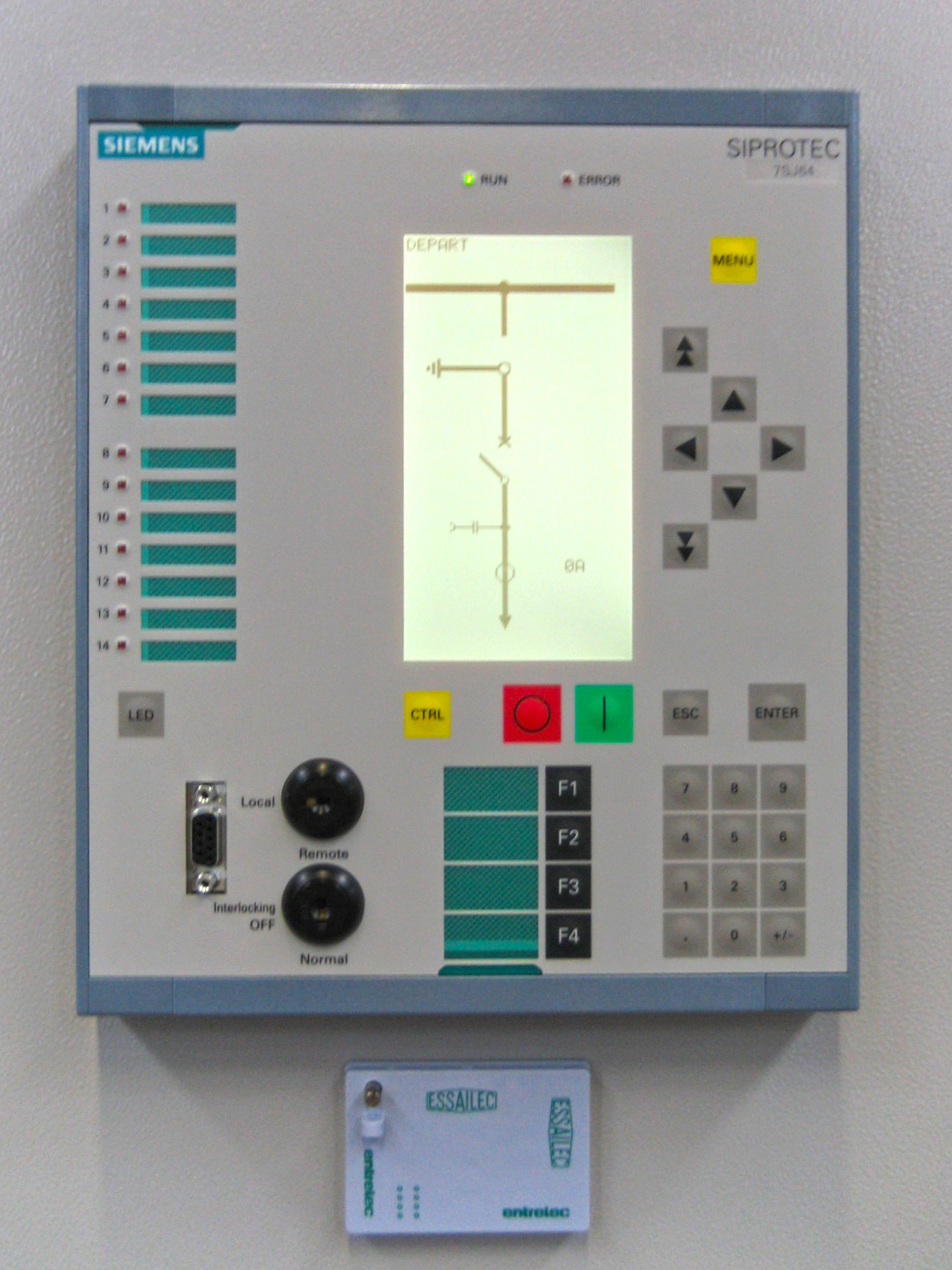
Protective relay is an example of an intelligent electronic device

In the electric power industry, an intelligent electronic device (IED) is an integrated microprocessor-based controller of power system equipment, such as circuit breakers, transformers and capacitor banks.

== Description ==
IEDs receive data from sensors and power equipment and can issue control commands, such as tripping circuit breakers if they sense voltage, current, or frequency anomalies, or raise/lower tap positions in order to maintain the desired voltage level. Common types of IEDs include protective relaying devices, tap changer controllers, circuit breaker controllers, capacitor bank switches, recloser controllers, voltage regulators etc. This is generally controlled by a setting file. The testing of setting files is typically one of the most time-consuming roles of a protection tester.

Digital protective relays are primarily IEDs, using a microprocessor to perform several protective, control and similar functions.

Some recent IEDs are designed to support the IEC61850 standard for substation automation, which provides interoperability and advanced communications capabilities.

IEDs are used as a more modern alternative to, or a complement of, setup with traditional remote terminal units (RTUs). Unlike the RTUs, IEDs are integrated with the devices they control and offer a standardized set of measuring and control points that is easier to configure and require less wiring. Most IEDs have a communication port and built-in support for standard communication protocols (DNP3, IEC104 or IEC 61850), so they can communicate directly with the SCADA system or a substation programmable logic controller. Alternatively, they can be connected to a substation RTU that acts as a gateway towards the SCADA server.

== See also ==
- Power system automation
