= Power-system automation =

Power-system automation is the act of automatically controlling the power system via instrumentation and control devices. Substation automation refers to using data from Intelligent electronic devices (IED), control and automation capabilities within the substation, and control commands from remote users to control power-system devices.

Since full substation automation relies on substation integration, the terms are often used interchangeably. Power-system automation includes processes associated with generation and delivery of power. Monitoring and control of power delivery systems in the substation and on the pole reduce the occurrence of outages and shorten the duration of outages that do occur. The IEDs, communications protocols, and communications methods, work together as a system to perform power-system automation. The term “power system” describes the collection of devices that make up the physical systems that generate, transmit, and distribute power. The term “instrumentation and control (I&C) system” refers to the collection of devices that monitor, control, and protect the power system. Many power-system automation are monitored by SCADA.

== Automation tasks ==
Power-system automation is composed of several tasks.

Data acquisition
Data acquisition refers to acquiring, or collecting, data. This data is collected in the form of measured analog current or voltage values or the open or closed status of contact points. Acquired data can be used locally within the device collecting it, sent to another device in a substation, or sent from the substation to one or several databases for use by operators, engineers, planners, and administration.
Supervision
Computer processes and personnel supervise, or monitor, the conditions and status of the power system using this acquired data. Operators and engineers monitor the information remotely on computer displays and graphical wall displays or locally, at the device, on front-panel displays and laptop computers.
Control
Control refers to sending command messages to a device to operate the I&C and power-system devices. Traditional supervisory control and data acquisition (SCADA) systems rely on operators to supervise the system and initiate commands from an operator console on the master computer. Field personnel can also control devices using front-panel push buttons or a laptop computer.

In addition, another task is power-system integration, which is the act of communicating data to, from, or among IEDs in the I&C system and remote users. Substation integration refers to combining data from the IED's local to a substation so that there is a single point of contact in the substation for all of the I&C data.

Power-system automation processes rely on data acquisition; power-system supervision and power-system control all working together in a coordinated automatic fashion. The commands are generated automatically and then transmitted in the same fashion as operator initiated commands.

== Hardware structure of the power-system automation ==
=== Data acquisition system ===
The instrument transformers with protective relays are used to sense the power-system voltage and current. They are physically connected to power-system apparatus and convert the actual power-system signals. The transducers convert the analog output of an instrument transformer from one magnitude to another or from one value type to another, such as from an ac current to dc voltage. Also the input data is taken from the auxiliary contacts of switch gears and power-system control equipment.

=== Main processing instrumentation and control (I&C) device ===
The I&C devices built using microprocessors are commonly referred to as intelligent electronic devices (IEDs). Microprocessors are single chip computers that allow the devices into which they are built to process data, accept commands, and communicate information like a computer. Automatic processes can be run in the IEDs. Some IEDs used in power-system automation are:

Remote Terminal Unit (RTU)
A remote terminal unit is an IED that can be installed in a remote location, and acts as a termination point for field contacts. A dedicated pair of copper conductors is used to sense every contact and transducer value. These conductors originate at the power-system device, are installed in trenches or overhead cable trays, and are then terminated on panels within the RTU. The RTU can transfer collected data to other devices and receive data and control commands from other devices. User programmable RTUs are referred to as “smart RTUs.”
Meter
A meter is an IED that is used to create accurate measurements of power-system current, voltage, and power values. Metering values such as demand and peak are saved within the meter to create historical information about the activity of the power system.
Digital fault recorder
A digital fault recorder (DFR) is an IED that records information about power-system disturbances. It is capable of storing data in a digital format when triggered by conditions detected on the power system. Harmonics, frequency, and voltage are examples of data captured by DFRs.
Programmable logic controller (PLC)
A Programmable Logic Controller can be programmed to perform logical control. As with the RTU, a dedicated pair of copper conductors for each contact and transducer value is terminated on panels within the PLC.It is like a work-horse which work upon the command given by their master.
Protective relay
A protective relay is an IED designed to sense power-system disturbances and automatically perform control actions on the I&C system and the power system to protect personnel and equipment. The relay has local termination so that the copper conductors for each contact do not have to be routed to a central termination panel associated with RTU.

=== Controlling (output) devices ===
Load tap changer (LTC)
Load tap changers are devices used to change the tap position on transformers. These devices work automatically or can be controlled via another local IED or from a remote operator or process.
Recloser controller
Recloser controllers remotely control the operation of automated reclosers and switches. These devices monitor and store power-system conditions and determine when to perform control actions. They also accept commands from a remote operator or process.

=== Communications devices ===
Communications processor
A communications processor is a substation controller that incorporates the functions of many other I&C devices into one IED. It has many communications ports to support multiple simultaneous communications links. The communications processor performs data acquisition and control of the other substation IEDs and also concentrates the data it acquires for transmission to one or many masters inside and outside the substation.

== Applications ==
=== Overcurrent protection ===
All lines and all electrical equipment must be protected against prolonged overcurrent. If the cause of the overcurrent is nearby then automatically that current is interrupted immediately. But if the cause of the overcurrent is outside the local area then a backup provision automatically disconnects all affected circuits after a suitable time delay.

Note that disconnection can, unfortunately, have a cascade effect, leading to overcurrent in other circuits that then also must therefore disconnect automatically.

Also note that generators that suddenly have lost their load because of such a protection operation will have to shut down automatically immediately, and it may take many hours to restore a proper balance between demand and supply in the system, partly because there must be proper synchronization before any two parts of the system can be reconnected.

Reclosing operations of circuit breakers usually are attempted automatically, and often are successful during thunderstorms, for example.

=== Supervisory control and data acquisition ===
A supervisory control and data acquisition system (SCADA) transmits and receives commands or data from process instruments and equipment. Power system elements ranging from pole-mounted switches to entire power plants can be controlled remotely over long distance communication links. Remote switching, telemetering of grids (showing voltage, current, power, direction, consumption in kWh, etc.), even automatic synchronization is used in some power systems.

== Optical fibers ==
Power utility companies protect high voltage lines by monitoring them constantly. This supervision requires the transmission of information between the power substations in order to ensure correct operation while controlling every alarm and failure. Legacy telecom networks were interconnected with metallic wires, but the substation environment is characterized by a high level of electromagnetic fields that may disturb copper wires.

Authorities use a tele-protection scheme to enable substations to communicate with one another to selectively isolate faults on high voltage lines, transformers, reactors and other important elements of the electrical plants. This functionality requires the continuous exchange of critical data in order to assure correct operation. In order to warranty the operation the telecom network should always be in perfect conditions in terms of availability, performance, quality and delays.

Initially these networks were made of metallic conductive media, however the vulnerability of the 56–64 kbit/s channels to electromagnetic interference, signal ground loops, and ground potential rise made them too unreliable for the power industry. Strong electromagnetic fields caused by the high voltages and currents in power lines occur regularly in electric substations.

Moreover, during fault conditions electromagnetic perturbations may rise significantly and disturb those communications channels based on copper wires. The reliability of the communications link interconnecting the protection relays is critical and therefore must be resistant to effects encountered in high voltage areas, such as high frequency induction and ground potential rise.

Consequently, the power industry moved to optical fibers to interconnect the different items installed in substations. Fiber optics need not be grounded and are immune to the interferences caused by electrical noise, eliminating many of the errors commonly seen with electrical connections. The use of fully optical links from power relays to multiplexers as described by IEEE C37.94 became standard.

A more sophisticated architecture for the protection scheme emphasizes the notion of fault tolerant networks. Instead of using a direct relay connection and dedicated fibers, redundant connections make the protection process more reliable by increasing the availability of critical data interchanges.

== C37.94 ==
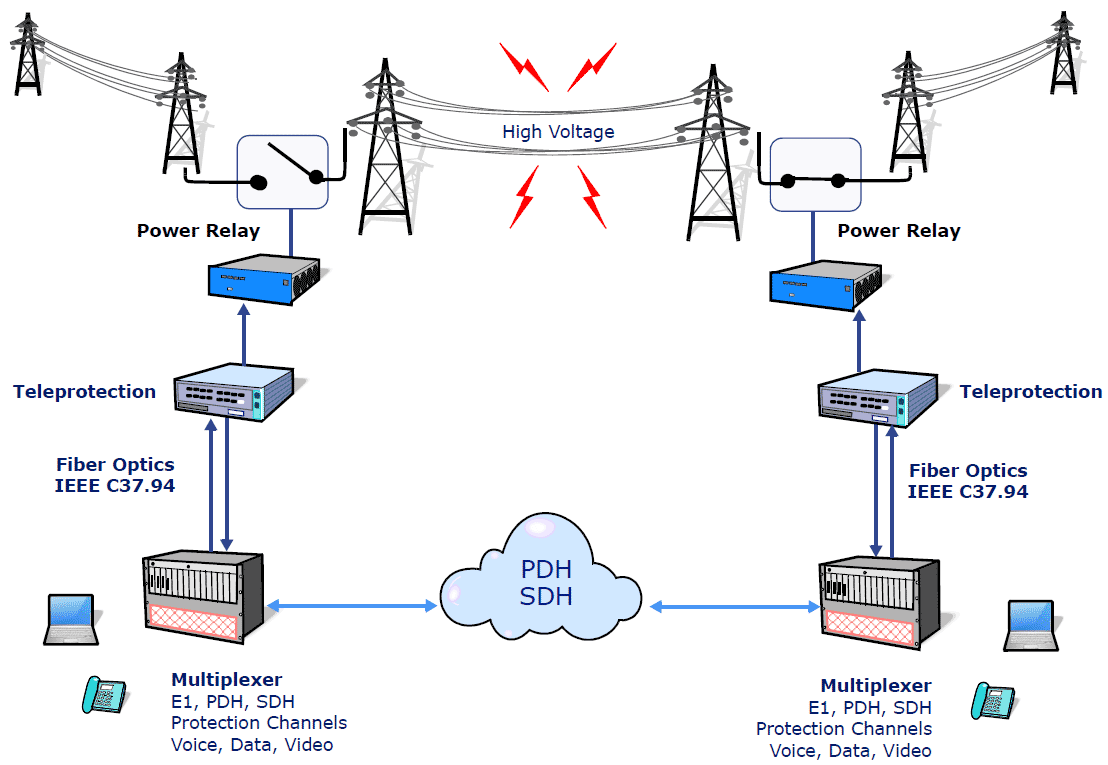
C37.94 protection architecture

IEEE C37.94, full title IEEE Standard for N Times 64 Kilobit Per Second Optical Fiber Interfaces Between Teleprotection and Multiplexer Equipment, is an IEEE standard, published in 2002, that defines the rules to interconnect tele-protection and multiplexer devices of power utility companies. The standard defines a data frame format for optical interconnection, and references standards for the physical connector for multi-mode optical fiber. Furthermore, it defines behavior of connected equipment on failure of the link, and the timing and optical signal characteristics.

Teleprotection systems must isolate faults very quickly to prevent damage to the network and power outages. The IEEE committee defined C37.94 as a programmable n x 64 kbit/s (n=1...12) multimode optical fiber interface to provide transparent communications between teleprotection relays and multiplexers for distances of up to 2 km. To reach longer distances, the power industry later adopted a single mode optical fiber interface as well.

The standard defines the protection and communications equipment inside a substation using optical fibers, the method for clock recovery, the jitter tolerances allowed in the signals, the physical connection method, and the actions the protection equipment must follow when any kind of network anomalies and faults occur. C37.94 was already implemented by many protection relay manufacturers such as ABB, SEL, RFL, and RAD; and tester manufacturers such as Net Research (NetProbe 2000), ALBEDO and VEEX. Teleprotection equipment once offered a choice of transmission interfaces, such as the IEEE C37.94 compliant optical fiber interface for transmission over fiber pairs, and G.703, 64 kbit/s co-directional and E1 interfaces.

== See also ==
- Automatic generation control
- International Council on Large Electric Systems (CIGRE)
- Smart grid
- Smart meter
- SCADA
