= IEC TC 57 =

Technical committee of the IEC

IEC Technical Committee 57 is one of the technical committees of the International Electrotechnical Commission (IEC). TC 57 is responsible for development of standards for information exchange for power systems and other related systems including Energy Management Systems, SCADA, distribution automation & teleprotection.

== Working groups ==
TC 57 consists of several working groups, each of which is responsible for development of standards within its domain. The active working groups are listed below.

TC 57 Working Groups
Working Group	Details	Standards Developed or related
WG 3	Telecontrol & Teleprotection standards	IEC 60870-5
WG 10	IED communications & associated data models in power systems	IEC 61850
WG 13	Software interfaces for operation and planning of the electric grid	IEC 61970
WG 14	Enterprise business function interfaces for utility operations	IEC 61968
WG 15	Data & Communication Security	IEC 62351
WG 16	Standards related to energy market communications	IEC 62325
WG 17	Communication systems for Distributed Energy Resources (DER)	IEC 61850-7-420
WG 18	Communication systems for Hydroelectric power plants	IEC 61850-7-410
WG 19	Interoperability within TC57 in the long term	standards for integration of CIM & SCL
WG 20	Planning of power line carrier systems	
WG 21	Other communication technologies	KNX (IEC 14543), BACnet (ISO 16484-5), Echonet (14543-4), Profibus & Profinet (IEC 61158/IEC 61784), LonTalk (IEC 14908.1)...
