= Manufacturing Message Specification =

International standard for messaging systems

- Abbreviation: MSS
- Status: Published
- Year started: 1990; 35 years ago
- First published: 1990; 35 years ago
- Latest version: 2 August 2003; 22 years ago
- Organization: International Organization for Standardization
- Series: ISO 9506
- Editors: ISO/TC 184/SC 5
- Authors: ISO/TC 184/SC 5 (Interoperability, integration, and architectures for enterprise systems and automation applications)
- Domain: Automation systems and integration
- License: single-user licence
- Website: www.iso.org/standard/37079.html

Manufacturing Message Specification (MMS) is an international standard (ISO 9506) dealing with messaging systems for transferring real time process data and supervisory control information between networked devices or computer applications. The standard is developed and maintained by the ISO Technical Committee 184 (TC184). MMS defines the following

- A set of standard objects which must exist in every device, on which operations like read, write, event signaling etc. can be executed. Virtual manufacturing device (VMD) is the main object and all other objects like variables, domains, journals, files etc. comes under VMD.
- A set of standard messages exchanged between a client and a server stations for the purpose of monitoring or controlling these objects.
- A set of encoding rules for mapping these messages to bits and bytes when transmitted.

== MMS original communication stack ==
MMS was standardized in 1990 under two separate standards as

1. ISO/IEC 9506-1 (2003): Industrial Automation systems - Manufacturing Message Specification - Part 1: Service Definition
2. ISO/IEC 9506-2 (2003): Industrial Automation systems - Manufacturing Message Specification - Part 2: Protocol Specification

This version of MMS used seven layers of OSI network protocols as its communication stack:

Application	Application Common Service Element (ACSE) - ISO 8649/8650
Presentation	Connection Oriented Presentation - ISO 8822/8823 Abstract Syntax Notation (ASN) - ISO 8824/8825
Session	Connection Oriented Session - ISO 8326/8327
Transport	Connection Oriented Transport - ISO 8072/8073
Network	Connectionless network - ISO 8348
Link	MAC - ISO 8802-3 [Ethernet] MAC - ISO 8802-4 [Token Ring]
Physical	Ethernet Token Ring

== MMS stack over TCP/IP ==
Because the Open Systems Interconnection protocols are challenging to implement, the original MMS stack never became popular. In 1999, Boeing created a new version of MMS using Internet protocols instead of the bottom four layers of the original stack plus RFC 1006 ("ISO Transport over TCP") in the transport layer. The top three layers use the same OSI protocols as before.

In terms of the seven-layer OSI model, the new MMS stack looks like this:

Application	Application Common Service Element (ACSE) - ISO 8649/8650
Presentation	Connection Oriented Presentation - ISO 8822/8823 Abstract Syntax Notation (ASN) - ISO 8824/8825
Session	Connection Oriented Session - ISO 8326/8327
Transport	ISO transport over TCP - RFC 1006 Transmission Control Protocol (TCP) - RFC 793
Network	Internet Control Message Protocol (ICMP) - RFC 792 Internet Protocol (IP) - RFC 791, 894 Address Resolution Protocol (ARP) - RFC 826
Link	MAC - ISO 8802-3 [Ethernet]
Physical	Ethernet

With the new stack, MMS has become a globally accepted standard.
