= Inductive Automation =

Industrial Automation Software

- Company type: Private
- Founded: 2003
- Founder: Steve Hechtman
- Headquarters: 90 Blue Ravine Road, Folsom, CA, United States
- Key people: Colby Clegg (CEO); Kat Jeschke (COO); Carl Gould (CTO); Don Pearson (CSO); Jason Waits (CISO); Travis Cox (Chief Technology Evangelist); Kevin McClusky (Chief Technology Architect); Steve Hechtman (Executive Chairman of the Board of Directors; CEO, 2003–2022)
- Products: Industrial Automation; HMI - SCADA - MES Software
- Website: www.inductiveautomation.com

Inductive Automation is a supplier of web-based industrial automation software based in Folsom, California, US. The Ignition SCADA platform is the company's main product line.

Inductive Automation has customers in a variety of industries including oil and gas, wastewater, food and beverage, utilities, energy, research, transportation, chemical processing, mining, aerospace, transportation, broadcasting, printing, plastics, construction, discrete manufacturing and process manufacturing in over 140 countries with over 1,200 independent automation integration companies.

Inductive Automation introduced the server-centric architecture for SCADA systems with FactorySQL and FactoryPMI in 2003. The company is a pioneer of supporting interoperability standards among SCADA vendors, and is a supporter of Open Source software and the OPC Foundation. The company was the first to implement a native Java OPC-UA stack in January 2010, making its products 100% cross platform, which is rare for commercial SCADA vendors.

== Licensing ==
Inductive Automation promotes an unlimited licensing structure, favoring a per server model that avoids charging for clients, PLC or SQL database connections, tags or visualization screens.

Inductive Automation offers "Limited" versions of the SQL Bridge and Vision modules that are restricted by functionality and concurrent clients, respectively.

== Ignition platform ==
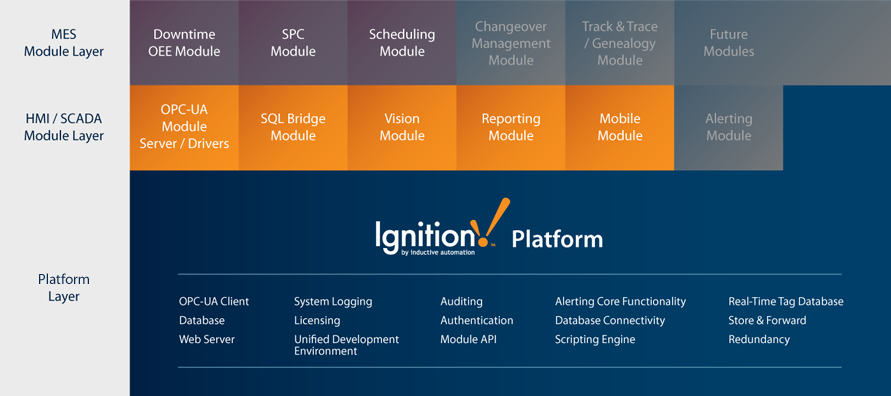
Inductive Automation Ignition Platform Architecture

Ignition is an Integrated Software Platform for SCADA systems used to achieve cross-platform web-based deployment through the Java Web Start Technology for both runtime clients and the integrated development environment. In 2018, Oracle released a statement that future versions of Java will no longer support Java Web Start. To achieve the same cross-platform web-based deployment for runtime clients in Ignition, Inductive Automation introduced custom Java-based launchers in November 2018."

=== MES Module Layer ===
MES Modules are provided through a third-party strategic partnership with Sepasoft, Inc. and are designed to be built on the Ignition platform. Sepasoft MES Modules generally provide higher-level functionality with less user development. MES Modules are designed to provide specific functionality and can be industry specific. The MES modules are designed to save integrators and end-users substantial amounts of time with out-of-the-box functionality and unlimited flexibility via custom scripting. The current core MES Modules available are "OEE Downtime", "Statistical Process Control" (SPC), "Track and Trace]" and "Recipe/Changeover". Sepasoft also offers "Utility Modules": "Instrument Interface", "Web Services" and a "Barcode Scanner". Newly released in 2019 is the Sepasoft Business Connector Suite featuring the Sepasoft Business Connector and Interface for SAP ERP modules, and Platform 3.0 MES Enterprise functionality.

=== HMI/SCADA Module Layer ===
The HMI/SCADA Module Layer contains mainstay products of the Ignition Platform. "Perspective" and "Vision" are the main visualization modules, "Perspective" also providing access to HTML 5 compatible devices such as smartphones and tablets. "Historian" is a bidirectional SQL timeseries data logging system, "SQL Bridge" is a bidirectional OPC-to-SQL database transaction manager, "Reporting" generates dynamic Pdf reports and "WebDev" provides web endpoints and resource hosting.

Other HMI/SCADA modules available are: "OPC-COM", "OPC-UA", "Alarm Notification", "SMS Notification", "Voice Notification" and "SFC modules". The following modules were announced for 2014-2015: "Enterprise Administration Module", "Upgraded Reporting Module" and "DNP3 Driver Module".

=== Platform Layer ===
The Platform Layer includes the following core functionality to all modules: OPC-UA Client, Database, Web Server, System Logging, Licensing, Unified Development Environment, Auditing, Authentication, Module API, Alerting Core Functionality, Database Connectivity, Scripting Engine, Realtime Tag Database, Store & Forward and Redundancy.

== Security ==
Inductive Automation promotes IT departments supporting security using standard methodology. The Ignition Platform supports the following security features:

- SSL/TLS All network traffic is encrypted with SSL/TLS technology.
- Active Directory Authentication Supports Microsoft Windows Active Directory authentication.
- Auditing allows administrators to review logs of activity.

The United States Computer Emergency Readiness Team (US-CERT) released advisory 11-231-01 that allowed malicious unauthenticated users to download sensitive information regarding project configuration. Inductive Automation responded by resolving the issue in version 7.2.8.178 and greater.

== Linux ==
Inductive Automation promotes cross-platform operating system choices for SCADA, citing that Windows has been a requirement due to the reliance of DCOM within OPC-DA, but organizations desire Linux for "security", "stability" and "reliability". Inductive Automation introduced Linux support in Ignition with the OPC-UA module in January 2010.

== Legacy products ==
FactorySQL is an OPC based Middleware product that bridges the gap between industrial PLCs and SQL Databases. FactorySQL is a drag and drop .NET application that runs as a Windows service. FactorySQL version 1.0 was released in 2003 and deprecated at version 4 in 2010 with the release of Ignition.

FactoryPMI is a Java based SCADA product containing three main components: the runtime, gateway, and designer. FactoryPMI version 1.0 was released in 2003 and deprecated at version 3 in 2010 with the release of Ignition.

== History ==
Version 1.0 of FactorySQL and FactoryPMI were released in 2003.

In January 2010, Inductive Automation consolidated FactorySQL and FactoryPMI under the modular Ignition platform. Ignition became the platform name, and FactorySQL and FactoryPMI became the SQL Bridge Module and Vision Module, respectively. The Reporting Module and OPC-UA Module were included in the initial release. This was considered "the first time a fully-featured industrial software package offered the same benefits on Windows and Linux".

The first Ignition Community Conference was held on September 16–18, 2013, in Folsom, California. Conferences were also held in September in 2014, 2015 and 2016.

Inductive University was announced and launched on September 25, 2014.

The latest version of Ignition, Ignition 8.3, was released in fall 2025.

== OPC-UA ==
Current drivers include A-B suite, ModbusTCP, Siemens S7 and Simple TCP/UDP, allowing users to connect to a multitude of devices such as PLCs, solar cells, lights, generators, flow meters and bar code scanners.

The Ignition OPC-UA server implemented the first native Java OPC UA stack. Inductive Automation offers the OPC-UA module for free.

== SQLTags ==
SQLTags is a proprietary technology that uses any SQL database as a tag database. Tags can be derived from the following sources: OPC, expression or constant and support various configuration options such as alerting, scaling, and historical storage. SQLTags are stored in "Tag Providers", which are automatically configured tables in an SQL database.

SQLTags Historian is a proprietary data logging technology that manages historical data in any supported SQL database. It is configured by defining an Ignition "SQL database connection", then enabling the feature on a per tag basis. The system automatically creates and manages the tables without any user SQL input. "Historical Scan Classes" support different logging intervals by sets of tags as well as altering the logging rate dynamically. This allows the system to store high resolution history when needed, but lower resolution data for other periods. The system automatically partitions data into multiple database tables. This accomplishes two functions: ensures consistent performance over the long term, and provides a consistent mechanism for data archival and pruning.

== Open source ==
Inductive Automation is a promoter and contributor to the Open source community. FactoryPMI utilizes a number of such projects including MySQL, Apache, JFreeChart, Jython, Hsqldb, jTDS and Bean Builder.

== Awards ==
Inductive Automation received the 2011 Duke's Choice award at the JavaOne conference in San Francisco, California, on October 4, 2011, for Ignition. Oracle recognized the impact of Ignition as a significant Java-based product in Industrial Automation since the platform implemented the first native Java OPC UA stack.

In 2015, Inductive Automation received the Partner of the Year Award from the Control System Integrators Association.

Automation World named Inductive Automation as the recipient of seven awards at the 2020 Leadership in Automation Awards.
