= Ignition SCADA =

Software platform

Ignition
- Developer: Inductive Automation
- Stable release: 8.3.3 / January 22, 2026; 6 days ago
- Written in: Java, Kotlin
- Operating system: Windows, macOS, Linux
- Type: SCADA
- Website: inductiveautomation.com/ignition

Ignition is an Integrated Software Platform for SCADA systems released by Inductive Automation in January 2010. Ignition features an OPC-UA server with an expansive suite of fieldbus connectivity extensions, a data historian with support for a variety of common database systems, two frontend platforms designed for creating Human-Machine Interfaces - a desktop application (Vision) and a web application (Perspective), and a rich API designed to support third-party modules. The Ignition platform has three main components: the Ignition Gateway, the Designer, and the runtime clients. Independent modules provide separate functionality in any or all of the platform components. Ignition SCADA modules provide features such as: Real-Time Status Control, Alarming, Reporting, Databases, Data Acquisition, Scripting, Scheduling, MES, and Mobile support.

== Awards ==
Ignition received the 2011 Duke's Choice award at the JavaOne conference in San Francisco, CA on October 4, 2011. Oracle recognized the impact of Ignition as a significant Java-based product in Industrial Automation.

Ignition received a 2011 Readers Choice award from Automation World in the SCADA and Information management categories.

== Ignition Modules ==
=== SQL Bridge ===
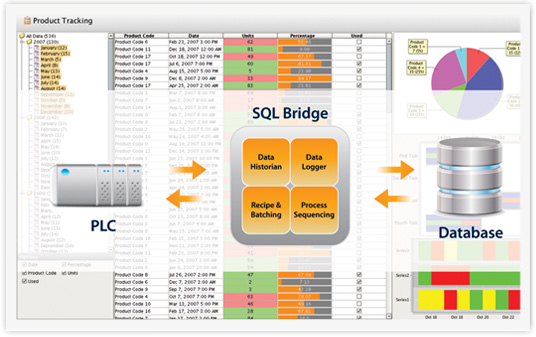
SQL Bridge Architecture Diagram from Inductive Automation Web Site

SQL Bridge is an OPC based Middleware product that bridges the gap between industrial PLCs and SQL Databases. It is a drag and drop application that does not require scripting or programming for configuration.

Transaction groups are used to log data, synchronize PLCs, track downtime and manage recipes. Such groups support stored procedures, flexible execution scheduling, and triggering for precise control and monitoring. Data logging can be achieved with transaction groups or SQLTags History.

Store-and-Forward is an engine that buffers SQL database writes to memory and caches them to a local disk when an external database connection is unavailable. Upon reconnection the data is forwarded to the server in aggregated time-efficient batches.

The SQL Bridge module was created in January 2010 to replace the final version of FactorySQL in the 4.x.x series.

=== Vision ===
The Vision module is one of the two main visualization modules of the Ignition SCADA platform.

- The Ignition Vision Runtime or Client is a Java application typically launched as an application on a client computer. It acts as the HMI interface for end users and can be used to view realtime or historical process data or control industrial applications. It can be launched one of two ways. As a Windowed application, where it acts like a normal application, or in Full Screen mode, where it occupies the whole screen without borders or toolbars, typical of an industrial Touchscreen application.
- The Vision module is based on Java Swing, and is capable of running code on the client computer directly, allowing direct access to hardware such as serial ports and RFID Readers.

=== Perspective ===
The Perspective module is the other main visualization module of the Ignition SCADA platform.

- Perspective is a React based web frontend for Ignition that runs on an integrated Apache Tomcat instance inside the Ignition gateway. It can be used by end users on any Webkit based browser to view realtime or historical process data or control industrial applications. It can be launched on any browser by entering the gateway URL, or launched via the Perspective Workstation tool on a computer that will open it in a dedicated window in a similar way to Vision.
- Perspective is based on HTML5 and CSS, allowing integrators to design fully responsive SCADA applications with the same methodology as a conventional web developer would use.

=== Reporting ===
The Reporting module creates dynamic reports. Reports may be generated from existing Adobe Acrobat (PDF) files or created from scratch. Data is introduced through the Ignition platform, providing access to any SQL database or OPC source. The Reporting Module supports: images, graphs, tables, and a variety of basic shape tools. Reports are viewed through Ignition's web-based system. The Reporting Module allows data aggregation and referencing between table and chart objects as displayed in the image screenshot.

=== SMS Notification Module ===
The Ignition SMS Alarm Notification Module enables both alarm notification and acknowledgement via text messages. By adding the SMS Notification Module to Ignition, alarm notifications can be sent and acknowledged via text messaging. SMS notification is an efficient and immediate method that makes it easier for users to respond. This module requires the Alarm Notification Module and a Sierra Wireless AirLink RV50 with a data and SMS cellular plan (not included in the module).

=== Twilio Notification Module ===
The Twilio Module enables alarm notifications to be sent and acknowledged though the Twilio messaging platform in the same manner as the SMS Notification Module.

=== OPC-UA ===
The OPC-UA Ignition module is an Eclipse Milo OPC server that supports modular drivers for PLCs and other devices and network connections. Before moving to Milo, the Ignition OPC-UA engine was the first 100% native Java OPC UA stack. The OPC-UA module includes a Quick Client that allows users to read and write PLC register values via an AJAX web page hosted on the Ignition Gateway.

Current included drivers include:

- Modbus Driver
- Simple UDP and TCP Drivers
- BACnet Driver
- Allen-Bradley Driver Suite
- Siemens S7 Driver
- DNP3 Driver
- Omron FINS Driver
- IEC 61850 Driver
- Mitsubishi Driver

-Allowing users to connect to a multitude of devices such as PLCs, lighting control, generators, flow meters, bar code scanners, HVAC and switchgear etc.

=== OPC-COM ===
The OPC-COM Module supports connections to local and remote OPC-DA servers. It works on both 32-bit and 64-bit systems. It has been tested for interoperability with third party OPC-DA servers at several OPC Interoperability conferences.

== Module Architecture ==
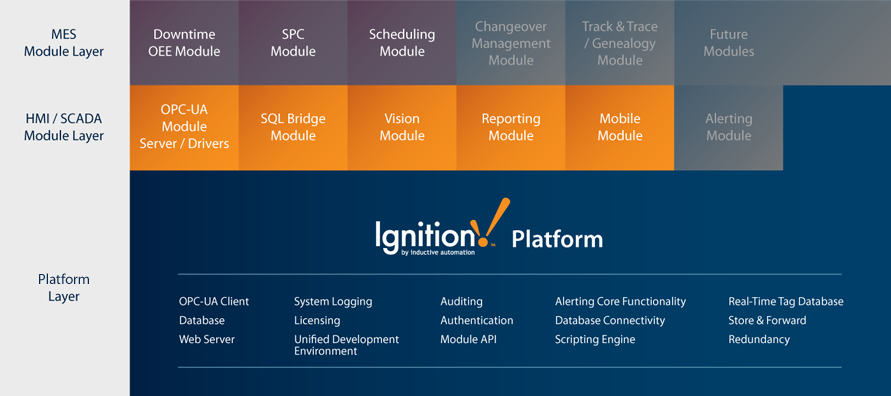
Inductive Automation Ignition Platform Architecture

=== MES Module Layer ===
MES Modules are separately licensed Ignition plug in modules that generally provide higher level functionality with less user development. MES Modules are designed to provide specific functionality and can be industry specific. Current modules available are: Downtime OEE, SPC, and Scheduling . The Changeover Management and Track & Trace / Genealogy Modules have been announced as upcoming as of January 2013.

=== HMI/SCADA Module Layer ===
The HMI/SCADA Module Layer contains mainstay products of the Ignition Platform. Vision is the main visualization module, SQL Bridge is a bidirectional OPC to SQL database historian and transaction manager, Reporting generates dynamic Pdf reports, and Mobile allows access to HTML 5 compatible devices such as iPads, iPods, Android, Smartphone, and Tablets.

=== Platform Layer ===
The Platform Layer includes the following core functionality to all modules: OPC-UA Client, Database, Web Server, System Logging, Licensing, Unified Development Environment, Auditing, Authentication, Module API, Alerting Core Functionality, Database Connectivity, Python Scripting Engine, Realtime Tag Database, Store & Forward, and Redundancy.

== History ==
=== FactorySQL ===
FactorySQL box

FactorySQL was an OPC based Middleware product by Inductive Automation that bridged the gap between industrial PLCs and SQL Databases. FactorySQL was a drag and drop .NET application that ran as a Windows service. FactorySQL version 1.0 was released in 2003 and deprecated at version 4 in 2010 with the release of Ignition Inductive Automation offered the OPC-UA module for free.

FactorySQL was initially written to be a drag and drop OPC to SQL data logger. Functionality was introduced to become a Transaction Manager and Industrial Historian. FactorySQL introduced SQLTags support with version 4.1 in December 2007.

FactorySQL configuration was done with standard Groups. This unit of configuration would morph from a historical logger, real-time status and control synchronizer, downtime tracker, recipe manager, etc. The group configuration defines the database connection, table, timing options, triggering options, and "direction". Direction defines whether read or write operations come from or go to the OPC server from the SQL database. "Bidirectional" allows a change from either side to be written to the other. Groups contain Items. Items are dragged from an OPC browsing tree or manually created. Each item represents a fully qualified OPC path along with a column name in the SQL database. Items also contain scaling options, OPC information, and other modes of operation.

Features listed from vendor web site:

- Easy Browsing Browse OPC servers from navigation tree.
- Drag & Drop Configuration Drag and drop tags from OPC browser to groups
- Bi-Directional Data Transfer Transfer data between PLCs and Databases, with a full range of options: timers, counters, triggers, and handshakes
- Built in Email Alerts
- Simple Group Visualization Visual indication of group status including running, stopped, or error status
- Stored Procedure Group Map OPCdata to and from SQL stored procedure parameters.
- Block Data Group mirror large blocks of OPC data in an SQL database through the use of array read and writes.
- Remote Configuration Group configuration over the network via TCP connection.
- Supports Most PLCs and Database Systems Support nearly every OPC compliant PLC and ODBC compliant SQL database.
- Redundancy Supports primary and backup failover modes.
- SQLTags Proprietary means to "turn any SQL database into a high-performance industrial tag database".

=== FactoryPMI ===
FactoryPMI box

FactoryPMI was a Java based SCADA product by Inductive Automation containing three main components: the runtime, gateway, and designer. The FactoryPMI designer began as a form of Sun's Bean Builder. FactoryPMI version 1.0 was released in 2003 and deprecated at version 3.3 in 2010 with the release of Ignition.

- The FactoryPMI Runtime or Client is a Java application typically launched from a web browser. It acts as the HMI interface for end users and can be used to view realtime or historical process data or control industrial applications. The runtime can be launched one of three ways. As an Applet inside a web browser, via Java Web Start, or in Full Screen Exclusive mode, where it occupies the whole screen without borders or toolbars, typical of an industrial Touchscreen application.
- The Gateway is a web page configurable, customized version of the Apache that uses JGroups multicasting for clustering. It runs a servlet that uses a single port to mediate client requests. It supports SSL/TLS and compresses communication between gateway and clients.
- The FactoryPMI Designer is a WYSIWYG IDE that is used to create SCADA applications. Like the runtime, is a Java Web Start application. The FactoryPMI designer began as a form of Sun's Bean Builder and has grown to facilitate industrial applications and incorporate Jython as the scripting engine.

Features listed from vendor web site.

- Unlimited Clients FactoryPMI allows an unlimited number of clients to connect from anywhere using web launched distribution.
- Web Launched Uses Java Web Start deployment technology.
- Active Directory Authentication Supports Microsoft Windows Active Directory authentication.
- Instant Change Deployment Saved changes in the FactoryPMI Designer are automatically pushed to all running FactoryPMI Clients.
- Clustering Connect two or more FactoryPMI Gateways to create a redundant cluster. Client load-balancing automatically spreads traffic over the entire cluster for a scale-out model.
- Powerful Scripting Language FactoryPMI uses the popular Python scripting language, enabling you to create advanced projects and fulfill custom requirements.
- Powerful Charts and Tables
- SQLTags Proprietary means to "turn any SQL database into a high-performance industrial tag database".

==== Versions ====
FactoryPMI major release history
Date released	Version	Comments
08/09/2005	1.3	New components.
10/18/2005	1.4	New proprietary component layout that no longer uses springs.
01/08/2006	1.5	Added industrial graphics library with 226 images.
06/28/2006	1.6	Added Plugin architecture. Added new components.
08/02/2006	1.7	Added concurrent developer support.
09/22/2006	1.8	Added project/gateway retargeting for the FactoryPMI Runtime, with support for parameter passing and startup window specification.
12/29/2006	2.0	Added ability to combine Gateways into clusters.
04/25/2007	2.1	Major improvements to the Designer introducing a docking style customizable user interface.
08/14/2007	2.2	Component Styles feature for dynamic multi-state animation.
09/17/2007	3.0	SQLTags feature implemented.
11/21/2007	3.1	SSL, Java 6, and "Standalone Mode" implemented.
03/06/2008	3.2	New serialization and window management.
12/16/2008	3.3	Status Chart and Tab Strip components.

=== 2010 consolidation ===
In 2010, Inductive Automation consolidated FactorySQL and FactoryPMI with Ignition by Inductive Automation. It created a modular framework, providing a central design interface for FactorySQL and FactoryPMI. Ignition became the platform, and FactorySQL and FactoryPMI were refactored as modules. FactorySQL became the SQL Bridge Module, and FactoryPMI became the Vision Module. Two other modules included with the initial release were: the Ignition Reporting Module, and the Ignition OPC-UA Module.

== SQLTags ==
SQLTags is a proprietary technology that uses any SQL Database as a Tag Database. Tags can be derived from the following sources: OPC, expression, or constant and support various configuration options such as: alerting, scaling, and historical storage. SQLTags are stored in Tag Providers, which are automatically configured tables in an SQL database.

SQLTags Historian is a proprietary data logging technology that manages historical data in any supported SQL Database. It is configured by defining an Ignition SQL database connection, then enabling the feature on a per tag basis. The system automatically creates and manages the tables without any user SQL input. Historical Scan Classes support different logging intervals by sets of tags as well as altering the logging rate dynamically. This allows the system to store high resolution history when needed, but lower resolution data for other periods. The system automatically partitions data into multiple database tables. This accomplishes two functions: ensures consistent performance over the long term, and provides a consistent mechanism for data archival and pruning.

== Scripting ==
The Ignition platform uses scripting to allow designers to add flexibility and customization. There are two major scripting languages in Ignition: Python and the Expression Language.

=== Python ===
Ignition uses an implementation of Python version 2.5 called Jython. Python script is used for component Event Handling. An example of this would be opening a popup window when a user clicks on a graphic object. Another common use are event scripts such as a timer that checks for alarms or a logon script. Java classes and methods can also be used in Jython for more specialized functionality.

=== Expression Language ===
The Ignition Expression Language is a simple language that was invented by Inductive Automation. An expression language is a very simple kind of language where everything is an expression - which is a piece of code that returns a value. This means that there are no statements and no variables, just operators, literals, and functions. Consider an example from the expression language found in Microsoft_excel. Excel can calculate a cell's value dynamically by typing an expression such as "=SUM(C5:C10)", which performs the arithmetic sum of those 6 cells. The expression language in Ignition functions similarly. It is used to define dynamic values for tags and component properties.

Expressions are divided in the following categories: Aggregates, Color, Date and Time, Logic, Math, String, Type Cast, and Advanced.

== Development ==
An Ignition Module SDK is available for anybody to develop their own modules. The SDK exposes the API and classes as separate JAR resources for the following: Client, Gateway, Designer, Common, Vision module. For example, a programmer wrote an Ignition module to integrate with QuickBooks, which uses SOAP to communicate with the QuickBooks Web Connector.

== Licensing ==
Ignition is typically sold with an unlimited licensing structure, favoring a per server/feature model that avoids charging for: clients, PLC or SQL Database connections, tags, or visualization screens.

The most common Ignition software package is The Works which includes unlimited versions of the following modules: SQL Bridge, Vision, Reporting, and Symbol Factory. Limited versions of the SQL Bridge and Vision Modules are restricted by functionality and concurrent clients, respectively.

== Performance ==
Ignition performance is based on tag changes per second and total number of concurrent clients. Inductive Automation released a 2008 white paper benchmarking SQLTags performance. Although testing was conducted on FactorySQL and FactoryPMI, Ignition performance is expected to be at least comparable. Evaluation utilized 150 Amazon EC2 virtual machines using the following databases: MySQL with MyISAM data engine, MySQL with InnoDB engine, Microsoft SQL Server 2005 Express Edition, and Oracle 10g Express Edition. As a real world point of comparison, a Surefire SCADA distillery project sustains 30,000 discrete tag changes per second on a Linux platform.

== Security ==
Inductive Automation promotes IT departments supporting security using standard methodology. Ignition supports the following security features:

- SSL/TLS All network traffic is encrypted with SSL/TLS technology.
- Active Directory Authentication Supports Microsoft Windows Active Directory authentication.
- Auditing allows administrators to review logs of activity.

The United States Computer Emergency Readiness Team (US-CERT) released advisory 11-231-01 that allowed malicious unauthenticated users to download sensitive information regarding project configuration. Inductive Automation responded by resolving the issue in version 7.2.8.178 and greater.

== Open Source ==
Inductive Automation is a promoter and contributor to the Open source community. FactoryPMI utilizes a number of such projects including: MySQL, Apache, JFreeChart, Jython, Hsqldb, jTDS, Bean Builder, and numerous others.
