= IEC 61400-25 =

International standard for communications for monitoring and control of wind power plants

International standard IEC 61400-25 (Communications for monitoring and control of wind power plants, TC 88) provides uniform information exchange for monitoring and control of wind power plants. This addresses the issue of proprietary communication systems utilizing a wide variety of protocols, labels, semantics, etc., thus enabling one to exchange information with different wind power plants independently of a vendor. It is a subset of IEC 61400; a set of standards for designing wind turbines.

The IEC 61400-25 standard is a basis for simplifying the roles that the wind turbine and SCADA systems have to play. The crucial part of the wind power plant information, information exchange methods, and communication stacks are standardized. They build a basis to which procurement specifications and contracts could easily refer.

The standard has specified five mapping (IEC 61400-25-4) to communication protocol stacks in order to address the real wind power business needs for communication. The mappings specified in the part of IEC 61400-25 comprises a mapping to SOAP-based web services, OPC/XML-DA, IEC 61850-8-1 MMS, IEC 60870-5-104 and a mapping to DNP3.

== Interoperability ==
For supporting the interoperability of the IEC 61400-25 standard, a user group was formed with a high degree of cooperation with user groups on IEC 61850 and DNP3. Users, manufacturers, service providers, and system integrators with interest in the specific issues on interoperability are recommend to address the IEC 61400-25 user group.

== Contents ==
- Part 25-1: Overall description of principles and models (IEC 61400-25-1:2017)
- Part 25-2: Information models (IEC 61400-25-2:2015)
- Part 25-3: Information exchange models (IEC 61400-25-3:2015)
- Part 25-4: Mapping to communication profile
- Part 25-5: Compliance testing (IEC 61400-25-5:2017)
- Part 25-6: Logical node classes and data classes for condition monitoring (IEC 61400-25-6:2016 )
- Part 25-71: Configuration description language (IEC TS 61400-25-71:2019)

== See also ==
- IEC 61850
- IEC 81346
