= B-Scada =

Software company based in Florida, US

B-Scada, Inc.
- Type: Public
- Traded as: SCDA
- Industry: Software
- Headquarters: Crystal River, FL, United States
- Area served: Worldwide
- Key people: Ronald DeSerranno (CEO) Brian Thornton (VP)
- Products: Status Device Cloud, Status Enterprise, Status Machine
- Website: www.scada.com

B-Scada (or Beyond–Scada) is a company based in Crystal River, Florida. B-Scada's product offerings include on-premises Supervisory Control and Data Acquisition (SCADA) and Human Machine Interface (HMI) software platforms, a cloud-based Internet of Things (IoT) software platform, and wireless sensing hardware. It is one of the first companies to use data modeling in SCADA systems to create virtual representations of real world physical assets.

== Data modeling ==
B-Scada uses data models as the basis of end users toolkits, which allow representations of assets with immediate interactions. It provides “templating,” where a data model is created for a type of object instead of for a specific object. Conventional HMI and SCADA products bind data from programmable logic controllers (PLCs) or other data sources directly to the graphics. Data modeling in HMI/SCADA allows the virtualized model of assets to be bound to the HMI/SCADA screens. The PLC or OPC Server memory addresses plus any additional associated information can then be referenced at run time, allowing one generic data model template to be used for many different specific assets.

== History ==
B-Scada was founded as Mobiform Software in 2003 by Ron DeSerranno, former Senior Software Engineer of Rockwell Software, Inc./Dynapro, Inc., where he served as the Development Lead and Architect for its industrial automation product, RSView.

=== Beyond SCADA ===
In October 2012, Mobiform Software announced it had changed its name to B-Scada (Beyond SCADA). It continued trading under the stock ticker symbol MOBS until announcing in October 2014 its new stock ticker symbol, SCDA.

=== Fuzz Mobile Marketing Solution ===
In July 2019, B-Scada launched Fuzz Mobile Marketing Solutions Inc., an online platform for sending bulk SMS messages.
