= Wargame (hacking) =

Cyber-security challenge and mind sport in hacking

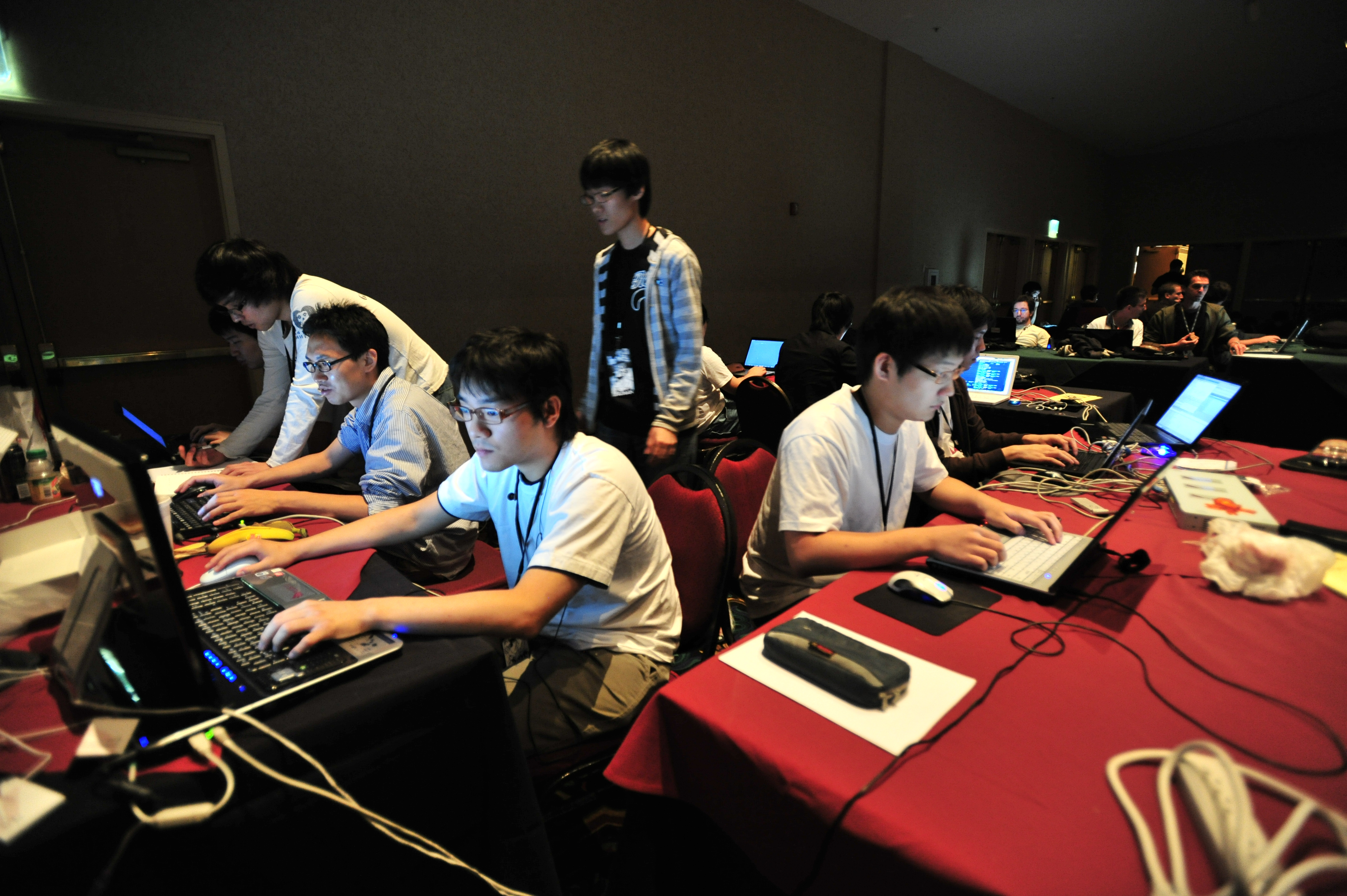

In hacking, a wargame (or war game) is a cyber-security challenge and mind sport in which the competitors must exploit or defend a vulnerability in a system or application, and/or gain or prevent access to a computer system.

A wargame usually involves a capture the flag logic, based on pentesting, semantic URL attacks, knowledge-based authentication, password cracking, reverse engineering of software (often JavaScript, C, and assembly language), code injection, SQL injections, cross-site scripting, exploits, IP address spoofing, forensics, and other hacking techniques.

== Wargames for preparedness ==
Wargames are also used as a method of cyberwarfare preparedness. The NATO Cooperative Cyber Defence Centre of Excellence (CCDCOE) organizes an annual event, Locked Shields, which is an international live-fire cyber exercise. The exercise challenges cyber security experts through real-time attacks in fictional scenarios and is used to develop skills in national IT defense strategies.

== Additional applications ==
Wargames can be used to teach the basics of web attacks and web security, giving participants a better understanding of how attackers exploit security vulnerabilities. Wargames are also used as a way to "stress test" an organization's response plan and serve as a drill to identify gaps in cyber disaster preparedness.

== See also ==
- Hackathon - computer programming marathon
- DEF CON - largest hacker convention
- Software Freedom Day - Linux and Open Source event
- Campus Party - massive LAN Party
- Cyberwarfare preparedness
- CTF
