= Industrial internet of things =

Devices networked together with computers' industrial applications

The industrial internet of things (IIoT) refers to interconnected sensors, instruments, and other devices networked together with computers' industrial applications, including manufacturing and energy management. This connectivity allows for data collection, exchange, and analysis, potentially facilitating improvements in productivity and efficiency as well as other economic benefits. The IIoT is an evolution of a distributed control system (DCS) that allows for a higher degree of automation by using cloud computing to refine and optimize the process controls.

== Overview ==
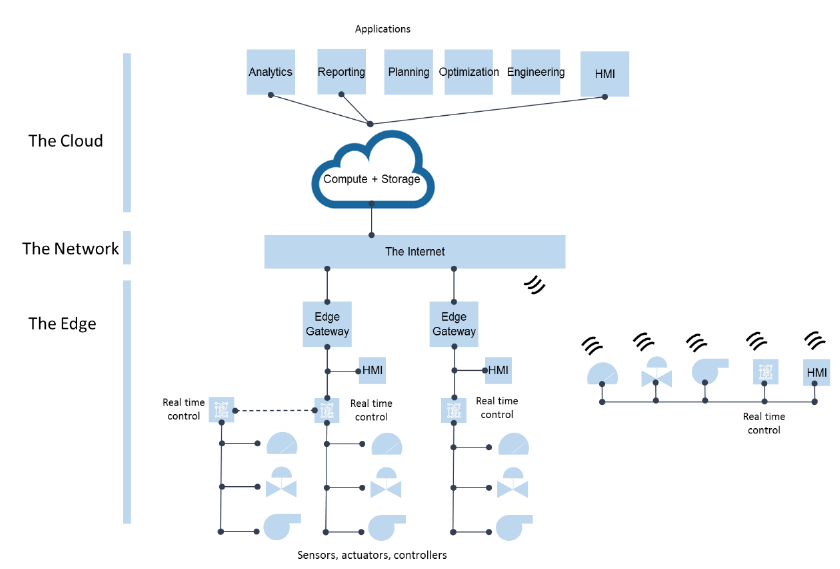
IIoT Architecture

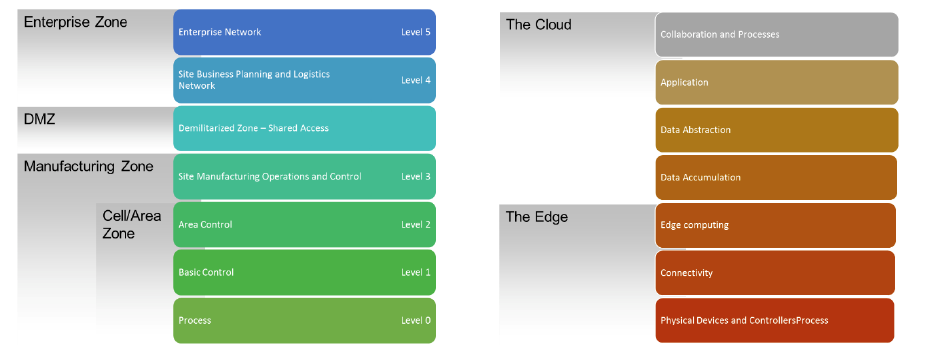
Purdue Enterprise Reference Architecture model on the left and IoT Reference Model on the right

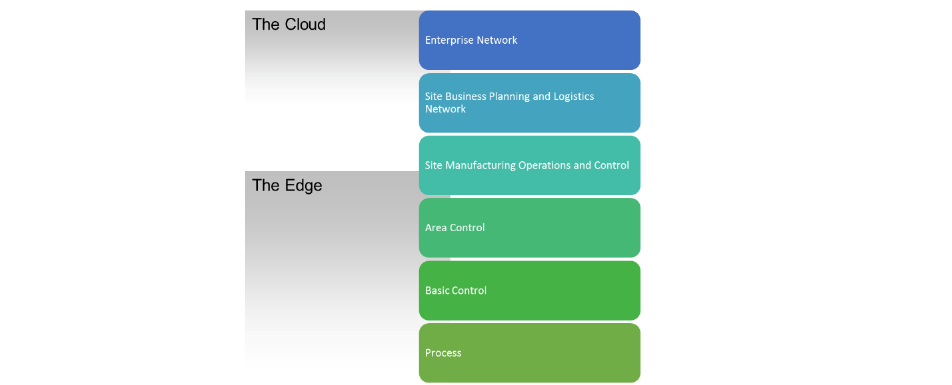
Approximate correspondence between levels in the Purdue model and the basic structure of the IoT

The IIoT is enabled by technologies such as cybersecurity, cloud computing, edge computing, mobile technologies, machine-to-machine, 3D printing, advanced robotics, big data, Internet of things, RFID technology, and cognitive computing. Five of the most important ones are described below:

- Cyber-physical systems (CPS): the basic technology platform for IoT and IIoT and therefore the main enabler to connect physical machines that were previously disconnected. CPS integrates the dynamics of the physical process with those of software and communication, providing abstractions and modeling, design, and analysis techniques.
- Cloud computing: With cloud computing IT services and resources can be uploaded to and retrieved from the Internet as opposed to a direct connection to a server. Files can be kept on cloud-based storage systems rather than on local storage devices.
- Edge computing: A distributed computing paradigm which brings computer data storage closer to the location where it is needed. In contrast to cloud computing, edge computing refers to decentralized data processing at the edge of the network. The industrial internet requires more of an edge-plus-cloud architecture rather than one based on purely centralized cloud; in order to transform productivity, products and services in the industrial world.
- Big data analytics: Big data analytics is the process of examining large and varied data sets, or big data.
- Artificial intelligence and machine learning: Artificial intelligence (AI) is a field within computer science in which intelligent machines are created that work and react like humans. Machine learning is a core part of AI, allowing software to more accurately predict outcomes without explicitly being programmed. It is also possible to combine artificial intelligence with edge computing in order to provide industrial edge intelligence solutions. There are many use-cases using AI with IIoT, to name a few: condition monitoring and predictive maintenance, process optimization, federate learning.

=== Architecture ===
IIoT systems are usually conceived as a layered modular architecture of digital technology. The device layer refers to the physical components: CPS, sensors or machines. The network layer consists of physical network buses, cloud computing and communication protocols that aggregate and transport the data to the service layer, which consists of applications that manipulate and combine data into information that can be displayed on the driver dashboard. The top-most stratum of the stack is the content layer or the user interface.

Layered Modular Architecture In IIoT
Content layer	User interface devices (e.g. computer screens, PoS stations, tablets, smart glasses, smart surfaces)
Service layer	Applications, software to analyze data and transform it into actionable information
Network layer	Communications protocols, Wi-Fi, Bluetooth, LoRa, cellular
Device layer	Hardware: CPS, machines, sensors

== History ==
The history of the IIoT begins with the invention of the programmable logic controller (PLC) by Richard E. Morley in 1968, which was used by General Motors in their automatic transmission manufacturing division. These PLCs allowed for fine control of individual elements in the manufacturing chain. In 1975, Honeywell and Yokogawa introduced the world's first DCSs, the TDC 2000 and the CENTUM system, respectively. These DCSs were the next step in allowing flexible process control throughout a plant, with the added benefit of backup redundancies by distributing control across the entire system, eliminating a singular point of failure in a central control room.

With the introduction of Ethernet in 1980, people began to explore the concept of a network of smart devices as early as 1982, when a modified Coke machine at Carnegie Mellon University became the first Internet-connected appliance, able to report its inventory and whether newly loaded drinks were cold. As early as in 1994, greater industrial applications were envisioned, as Reza Raji described the concept in IEEE Spectrum as "[moving] small packets of data to a large set of nodes, so as to integrate and automate everything from home appliances to entire factories".

The concept of the Internet of things first became popular in 1999, through the Auto-ID Center at MIT and related market-analysis publications. Radio-frequency identification (RFID) was seen by Kevin Ashton (one of the founders of the original Auto-ID Center) as a prerequisite for the Internet of things at that point. If all objects and people in daily life were equipped with identifiers, computers could manage and inventory them. Besides using RFID, the tagging of things may be achieved through such technologies as near field communication, barcodes, QR codes and digital watermarking.

The current conception of the IIoT arose after the emergence of cloud technology in 2002, which allows for the storage of data to examine for historical trends, and the development of the OPC Unified Architecture protocol in 2006, which enabled secure, remote communications between devices, programs, and data sources without the need for human intervention or interfaces.

One of the first consequences of implementing the industrial internet of things (by equipping objects with minuscule identifying devices or machine-readable identifiers) would be to create instant and ceaseless inventory control. Another benefit of implementing an IIoT system is the ability to create a digital twin of the system. Using this digital twin allows for further optimization of the system by allowing for experimentation with new data from the cloud without having to halt production or sacrifice safety, as the new processes can be refined virtually until they are ready to be implemented. A digital twin can also serve as a training ground for new employees who won't have to worry about real impacts on the live system.

== Standards and frameworks ==
IoT frameworks help support the interaction between "things" and allow for more complex structures like distributed computing and the development of distributed applications.

- IBM has announced cognitive IoT, which combines traditional IoT with machine intelligence and learning, contextual information, industry-specific models and natural language processing.
- The XMPP Standards Foundation (XSF) is creating such a framework called Chatty Things, which is a fully open, vendor-independent standard using XMPP to provide a distributed, scalable, and secure infrastructure.
- REST is a scalable architecture which allows for things to communicate over Hypertext Transfer Protocol and is easily adopted for IoT applications to provide communication from a thing to a central web server.
- MQTT is a publish-subscribe architecture on top of TCP/IP which allows for bi-directional communication between a thing and a MQTT broker.
- Node-RED is an open-source software designed by IBM to connect APIs, hardware, and online services.
- OPC is a series of standards designed by the OPC Foundation to connect computer systems to automated devices.
- OMG Data Distribution Service (DDS) - is open international middleware standard directly addressing publish-subscribe communications for real-time and embedded systems.
- The Industrial Internet Consortium's (IIC) Industrial Internet Reference Architecture (IIRA) and the German Industry 4.0 are independent efforts to create a defined standard for IIoT-enabled facilities.

== Application and industries ==
The term industrial internet of things is often encountered in the manufacturing industries, referring to the industrial subset of the IoT. Potential benefits of the industrial internet of things include improved productivity, improved reliability, analytics and the transformation of the workplace. The potential of growth by implementing IIoT is predicted to generate $15 trillion of global GDP by 2030.

While connectivity and data acquisition are imperative for IIoT, they are not the end goals, but rather the foundation and path to something bigger. Of all the technologies, predictive maintenance is an "easier” application, as it is applicable to existing assets and management systems. Intelligent maintenance systems can reduce unexpected downtime and increase productivity, which is projected to save up to 12% over scheduled repairs, reduce overall maintenance costs up to 30%, and eliminate breakdowns up to 70%, according to some studies. Cyber-physical systems (CPS) are the core technology of industrial big data and they will be an interface between human and the cyber world.

Integration of sensing and actuation systems connected to the Internet can optimize energy consumption as a whole. It is expected that IoT devices will be integrated into all forms of energy consuming devices (switches, power outlets, bulbs, televisions, etc.) and be able to communicate with the utility supply company in order to effectively balance power generation and energy usage. Besides home based energy management, the IIoT is especially relevant to the Smart Grid since it provides systems to gather and act on energy and power-related information in an automated fashion with the goal to improve the efficiency, reliability, economics, and sustainability of the production and distribution of electricity. Using advanced metering infrastructure (AMI) devices connected to the Internet backbone, electric utilities can not only collect data from end-user connections, but also manage other distribution automation devices like transformers and reclosers.

As of 2016, other real-world applications include incorporating smart LEDs to direct shoppers to empty parking spaces or highlight shifting traffic patterns, using sensors on water purifiers to alert managers via computer or smartphone when to replace parts, attaching RFID tags to safety gear to track personnel and ensure their safety, embedding computers into power tools to record and track the torque level of individual tightenings, and collecting data from multiple systems to enable the simulation of new processes.

=== Automotive industry ===
Using IIoT in car manufacturing implies the digitalization of all elements of production. Software, machines, and humans are interconnected, enabling suppliers and manufacturers to rapidly respond to changing standards. IIoT enables efficient and cost-effective production by moving data from the customers to the company's systems, and then to individual sections of the production process. With IIoT, new tools and functionalities can be included in the manufacturing process. For example, 3D printers simplify the way of shaping pressing tools by printing the shape directly from steel granulate. These tools enable new possibilities for designing (with high precision). Customization of vehicles is also enabled by IIoT due to the modularity and connectivity of this technology. While in the past they worked separately, IIoT now enables humans and robots to cooperate. Robots take on heavy and repetitive activities, so the manufacturing cycles are quicker and the vehicle comes to the market more rapidly. Factories can quickly identify potential maintenance issues before they lead to downtime and many of them are moving to a 24-hour production plant, due to higher security and efficiency. The majority of automotive manufacturers companies have production plants in different countries, where different components of the same vehicle are built. IIoT makes it possible to connect these production plants to each other, creating the possibility to move within facilities. Big data can be visually monitored which enables companies to respond faster to fluctuations in production and demand.

=== Oil and gas industry ===
With IIOT support, large amounts of raw data can be stored and sent by the drilling gear and research stations for cloud storage and analysis. With IIOT technologies, the oil and gas industry has the capability to connect machines, devices, sensors, and people through interconnectivity, which can help companies better address fluctuations in demand and pricing, address cybersecurity, and minimize environmental impact.

Across the supply chain, IIOT can improve the maintenance process, the overall safety, and connectivity. Drones can be used to detect possible oil and gas leaks at an early stage and at locations that are difficult to reach (e.g. offshore). They can also be used to identify weak spots in complex networks of pipelines with built-in thermal imaging systems. Increased connectivity (data integration and communication) can help companies with adjusting the production levels based on real-time data of inventory, storage, distribution pace, and forecasted demand. For example, a Deloitte report states that by implementing an IIOT solution integrating data from multiple internal and external sources (such as work management system, control center, pipeline attributes, risk scores, inline inspection findings, planned assessments, and leak history), thousands of miles of pipes can be monitored in real-time. This allows monitoring of pipeline threats, improving risk management, and providing situational awareness.

Benefits also apply to specific processes of the oil and gas industry. The exploration process of oil and gas can be done more precisely with 4D models built by seismic imaging. These models map fluctuations in oil reserves and gas levels, they strive to point out the exact quantity of resources needed, and they forecast the lifespan of wells. The application of smart sensors and automated drillers gives companies the opportunity to monitor and produce more efficiently. Further, the storing process can also be improved with the implementation of IIOT by collecting and analyzing real-time data to monitor inventory levels and temperature control. IIOT can enhance the transportation process of oil and gas by implementing smart sensors and thermal detectors to give real-time geolocation data and monitor the products for safety reasons. These smart sensors can monitor the refinery processes, and enhance safety. The demand for products can be forecasted more precisely and automatically be communicated to the refineries and production plants to adjust production levels.

=== Agriculture industry ===
In the agriculture industry, IIoT helps farmers to make decisions about when to harvest. Sensors collect data about soil and weather conditions and propose schedules for fertilizing and irrigating. Some livestock farms implant microchips into animals. This allows the farmers not only to trace their animals, but also pull up information about the lineage, weight, or health.

=== PV industry ===
The integration of IIoT data in the photovoltaic (PV) industry can significantly enhance the efficiency, reliability, and performance of solar power systems. IIoT with AI data can be utilized for real-time monitoring, performance optimization, fault detection, diagnostics.

== Security ==
As the IIoT expands, new security concerns arise with it. Every new device or component that connects to the IIoT can become a potential liability. Gartner estimates that by 2020, more than 25% of recognized attacks on enterprises will involve IoT-connected systems, despite accounting for less than 10% of IT security budgets. Existing cybersecurity measures are vastly inferior for Internet-connected devices compared to their traditional computer counterparts, which can allow for them to be hijacked for DDoS-based attacks by botnets like Mirai. Another possibility is the infection of Internet-connected industrial controllers, like in the case of Stuxnet, without the need for physical access to the system to spread the worm.

Additionally, IIoT-enabled devices can allow for more “traditional” forms of cybercrime, as in the case of the 2013 Target data breach, where information was stolen after hackers gained access to Target's networks via credentials stolen from a third party HVAC vendor. The pharmaceutical manufacturing industry has been slow to adopt IIoT advances because of security concerns such as these. One of the difficulties in providing security solutions in IIoT applications is the fragmented nature of the hardware. Consequently, security architectures are turning towards designs that are software-based or device-agnostic.

Hardware-based approaches, like the use of data diodes, are often used when connecting critical infrastructure.

== See also ==
- Internet of things
