= OPC Historical Data Access =

This group of standards, created by the OPC Foundation, provides COM specifications for communicating data from devices and applications that provide historical data, such as databases. The specifications provides for access to raw, interpolated and aggregate data (data with calculations).

OPC Historical Data Access, also known as OPC HDA, is used to exchange archived process data. This is in contrast to the OPC Data Access (OPC DA) specification that deals with real-time data. OPC technology is based on client / server architecture. Therefore, an OPC client, such as a trending application or spreadsheet, can retrieve data from an OPC compliant data source, such as a historian, using OPC HDA.

Similar to the OPC Data Access specification, OPC Historical Data Access also uses Microsoft's DCOM to transport data. DCOM also provides OPC HDA with full security features such as user authentication and authorization, as well as communication encryption services. OPC HDA Clients and Servers can reside on separate PCs, even if they are separated by a firewall. To do this, system integrators must configure DCOM properly as well as open ports in the firewall. If using the Windows firewall, users only need to open a single port.

== See also ==
- OLE for process control
- OPC Foundation
- OPC Data Access
