= RP-570 =

Communications protocol used in industrial environments

RP-570 is a communications protocol used in industrial environments to communicate between a front-end computer and the substation to be controlled.

It is a SCADA legacy protocol and is based on the low-level protocol IEC TC57, format class 1.2.

RP-570 stands for: "RTU Protocol based on IEC 57 part 5-1 (present IEC 870) version 0 or 1"
