= Process control network =

A Process Control Network (PCN) is a communications network layer that is a part of the Industrial Automation networks in Process Industries. This network is used to transmit instructions and data between control and measurement units and Supervisory Control and Data Acquisition (SCADA) equipment.

== Industry requirements ==
These networks have, over the years, used many of the technologies and topologies utilised in other network applications. However, Process Control Networks (PCNs) have several special requirements that must be met in order for the solution to be acceptable to the industry. These requirements are, in no particular order: Robustness, Determinacy, Compatibility. Robustness includes requirements such as connection redundancy, reduced sensitivity to Electromagnetic Interference (EMI), and good error checking and correction. Determinacy involves assuring that each device is guaranteed access to the network, and in many cases mechanisms to allow priority information (such as alarms) through the system. Compatibility allows SCADA and Distributed Control Systems (DCS) from various manufacturers to communicate with control and measurement equipment from others.

== Development of standards ==
Many early PCNs were serial based, using low level standards such as EIA RS-422 and EIA RS-485 with proprietary protocols on top. One of the de facto standards (which is now becoming an open standard) is Modbus, originally from Modicon. Many PCNs used token passing based protocols because they are essentially deterministic. Both Allen Bradley and Eurotherm utilised such mechanisms. Many of the measurement and control unit manufacturers signed up to the Fieldbus consortium but rather than one standard emerging each manufacturer promoted their own 'standard' leading to a myriad, and confusing, range of physical and logical systems. Modern process control networks rely on Ethernet, TCP/IP, and Microsoft Windows technology.
