= IEC 61400 =

Wind turbine international standard

IEC 61400 is an international standard published by the International Electrotechnical Commission (IEC) regarding wind turbines.

== Purpose and function ==
IEC 61400 is a set of design requirements made to ensure that wind turbines are appropriately engineered against damage from hazards within the planned lifetime. The standard concerns most aspects of the turbine life from site conditions before construction, to turbine components being tested, assembled and operated.

Wind turbines are capital intensive, and are usually purchased before they are being erected and commissioned.

Some of these standards provide technical conditions verifiable by an independent, third party, and as such are necessary in order to make business agreements so wind turbines can be financed and erected.

IEC started standardizing international certification on the subject in 1995, and the first standard appeared in 2001.

The common set of standards sometimes replaces the various national standards, forming a basis for global certification.

Small wind turbines are defined as being of up to 200 m^{2} swept area and a somewhat simplified IEC 61400-2 standard addresses these. It is also possible to use the IEC 61400-1 standard for turbines of less than 200 m^{2} swept area.

The standards for loads and noise are used in the development of prototypes at the Østerild Wind Turbine Test Field.

== Harmonization ==
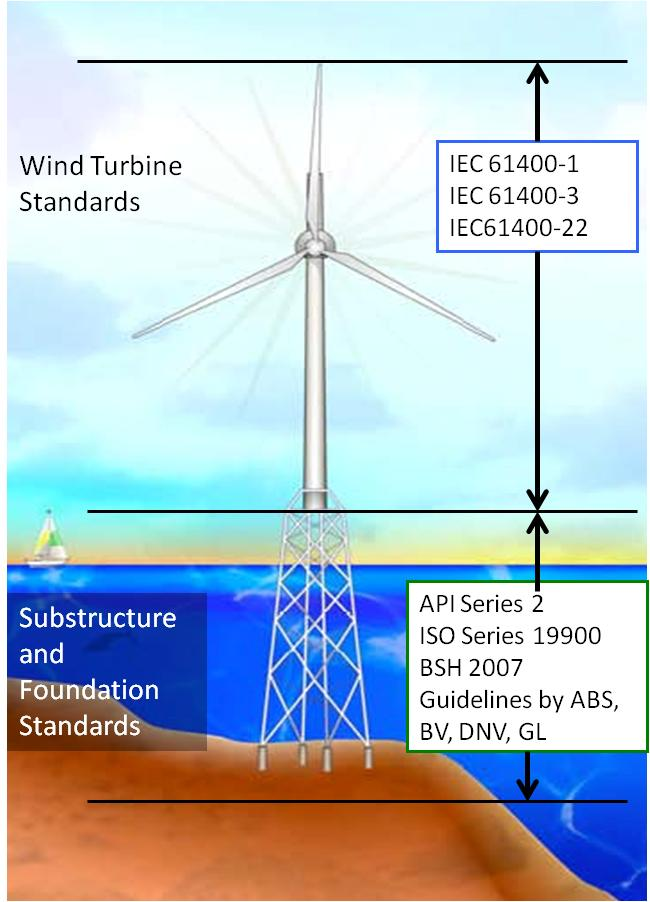
IEC, API, ISO etc. standards used to certify US offshore wind turbines

In the U.S., standards are intended to be compatible with IEC standards, and some parts of 61400 are required documentation.

The U.S. National Renewable Energy Laboratory participates in IEC standards development work, and tests equipment according to these standards. For U.S. offshore turbines however, more standards are needed, and the most important are :

- ISO 19900, General requirements for offshore structures
- ISO 19902, Fixed steel offshore structures
- ISO 19903, Fixed concrete offshore structures
- ISO 19904-1, Floating offshore structures – mono-hulls, semisubmersibles and spars
- ISO 19904-2, Floating offshore structures - tension-leg platforms
- API RP 2A-WSD, Recommended practice for planning, designing and constructing fixed offshore steel platforms - working stress design.

In Canada, the previous national standards were outdated and impeded the wind industry, and they were updated and harmonized with 61400 by the Canadian Standards Association with several modifications.

For small wind turbines the global industry has been working towards harmonisation of certification requirements with a "test once, certify everywhere" objective. Considerable co-operation has been taking place between UK, USA, and more recently Japan, Denmark and other countries so that the IEC 61400-2 standard as interpreted within e.g. the MCS certification scheme (of UK origin) is interoperable with the USA (for example where it corresponds to an AWEA small wind turbine standard) and other countries.

== Wind Turbine Generator (WTG) classes ==
Wind turbines are designed for specific conditions. During the construction and design phase assumptions are made about the wind climate that the wind turbines will be exposed to. Turbine wind class is just one of the factors needing consideration during the complex process of planning a wind power plant. Wind classes determine which turbine is suitable for the normal wind conditions of a particular site. Turbine classes are determined by three parameters - the average wind speed, extreme 50-year gust, and turbulence.

Turbulence intensity quantifies how much the wind varies typically within 10 minutes. Because the fatigue loads of a number of major components in a wind turbine are mainly caused by turbulence, the knowledge of how turbulent a site is of crucial importance. Normally the wind speed increases with increasing height due to vertical wind shear. In flat terrain the wind speed increases logarithmically with height. In complex terrain the wind profile is not a simple increase and additionally a separation of the flow might occur, leading to heavily increased turbulence.

Wind Class/Turbulence	Annual average wind speed at hub-height	Extreme 50-year gust
Ia High wind - Higher Turbulence 18%	10 metres per second (36 km/h; 22 mph)	70 metres per second (250 km/h; 160 mph)
Ib High wind - Lower Turbulence 16%	10 metres per second (36 km/h; 22 mph)	70 metres per second (250 km/h; 160 mph)
IIa Medium wind - Higher Turbulence 18%	8.5 metres per second (31 km/h; 19 mph)	59.5 metres per second (214 km/h; 133 mph)
IIb Medium wind - Lower Turbulence 16%	8.5 metres per second (31 km/h; 19 mph)	59.5 metres per second (214 km/h; 133 mph)
IIIa Low wind - Higher Turbulence 18%	7.5 metres per second (27 km/h; 17 mph)	52.5 metres per second (189 km/h; 117 mph)
IIIb Low wind - Lower Turbulence 16%	7.5 metres per second (27 km/h; 17 mph)	52.5 metres per second (189 km/h; 117 mph)
IV	6.0 metres per second (22 km/h; 13 mph)	42 metres per second (150 km/h; 94 mph)

The extreme wind speeds are based on the 3 second average wind speed. Turbulence is measured at 15 m/s wind speed. This is the definition in IEC 61400-1 edition 2.

For U.S. waters however, several hurricanes have already exceeded wind class Ia with speeds above the 70 m/s (156 mph), and efforts are being made to provide suitable standards. In 2021, TÜV SÜD developed a standard to simulate a new wind class T1 for tropical cyclones.

== List of IEC 61400 parts ==
- IEC 61400-1:2005+AMD1:2010 CSV Design requirements (Consolidated Version)
- IEC 61400-1:2019 RLV Design requirements (Redline Version)
- IEC 61400-2:2013 Small wind turbines
- IEC 61400-3-1:2019 Design requirements for fixed offshore wind turbines
- IEC TS 61400-3-2:2025 Design requirements for floating offshore wind turbines
- IEC 61400-4:2025 Design requirements for wind turbine gearboxes
- IEC TS 61400-4-1:2026 Reliability assessment of drivetrain components in wind turbines
- IEC TR 61400-4-2:2026 Lubrication of drivetrain components in wind turbines
- IEC 61400-5:2020+AMD1:2025 CSV Wind turbine blades (Consolidated Version)
- IEC 61400-6:2020 Tower and foundation design requirements
- IEC 61400-8:2024 Design of wind turbine structural components
- IEC 61400-9:2025 Probabilistic design measures for wind turbines
- IEC 61400-11:2012+AMD1:2018 CSV Acoustic noise measurement techniques (Consolidated Version)
- IEC TS 61400-11-2:2024 Acoustic noise measurement techniques - Measurement of wind turbine sound characteristics in receptor position
- IEC 61400-12:2022 Power performance measurements of electricity producing wind turbines - Overview
- IEC 61400-12-1:2022 Power performance measurements of electricity producing wind turbines
- IEC 61400-12-2:2022 Power performance of electricity producing wind turbines based on nacelle anemometry
- IEC 61400-12-3:2022 Power performance - Measurement based site calibration
- IEC TR 61400-12-4:2020 Numerical site calibration for power performance testing of wind turbines
- IEC 61400-12-5:2022 Power performance - Assessment of obstacles and terrain
- IEC 61400-12-6:2022 Measurement based nacelle transfer function of electricity producing wind turbines
- IEC 61400-13:2015+AMD1:2021 CSV Measurement of mechanical loads (Consolidated Version)
- IEC TS 61400-14:2005 Declaration of apparent sound power level and tonality values
- IEC 61400-15-1:2025 Site suitability input conditions for wind power plants
- IEC 61400-21-1:2019 Measurement and assessment of electrical characteristics - Wind turbines
- IEC 61400-21-2:2023 Measurement and assessment of electrical characteristics - Wind power plants
- IEC TR 61400-21-3:2019 Measurement and assessment of electrical characteristics - Wind turbine harmonic model and its application
- IEC TS 61400-21-4:2025 Measurement and assessment of electrical characteristics - Wind turbine components and subsystems
- IEC 61400-23:2014 Full-scale structural testing of rotor blades
- IEC 61400-24:2019+AMD1:2024 CSV Lightning protection (Consolidated Version)
- IEC 61400-25-1:2017 RLV Communications for monitoring and control of wind power plants - Overall description of principles and models (Redline Version)
- IEC 61400-25-2:2015 Communications for monitoring and control of wind power plants - Information models
- IEC 61400-25-3:2015 RLV Communications for monitoring and control of wind power plants - Information exchange models (Redline Version)
- IEC 61400-25-4:2016 RLV Communications for monitoring and control of wind power plants - Mapping to communication profile (Redline Version)
- IEC 61400-25-5:2017 Communications for monitoring and control of wind power plants - Conformance testing
- IEC 61400-25-6:2016 Communications for monitoring and control of wind power plants - Logical node classes and data classes for condition monitoring
- IEC TS 61400-25-71:2019 Communications for monitoring and control of wind power plants - Configuration description language
- IEC TS 61400-26-1:2019 Availability for wind energy generation systems
- IEC TS 61400-26-4:2024 Reliability for wind energy generation systems
- IEC 61400-27-1:2020 Electrical simulation models - Generic models
- IEC 61400-27-2:2020 Electrical simulation models - Model validation
- IEC TS 61400-28:2025 Through-life management and life extension of wind power assets
- IEC TS 61400-29:2023 Marking and lighting of wind turbines
- IEC TS 61400-30:2023 Safety of wind turbine generators - General principles for design
- IEC TS 61400-31:2023 Siting risk assessment
- IEC 61400-40:2026 Electromagnetic compatibility (EMC) - Requirements and test methods
- IEC 61400-50:2022 Wind measurement - Overview
- IEC 61400-50-1:2022 Wind measurement - Application of meteorological mast, nacelle and spinner mounted instruments
- IEC 61400-50-2:2022 Wind measurement - Application of ground-mounted remote sensing technology
- IEC 61400-50-3:2022 Use of nacelle-mounted lidars for wind measurements
- IEC TS 61400-50-4:2025 Use of floating lidar systems for wind measurements

== See also ==
- IEC 61400-25
