= Carnegie Mellon CyLab =

Computer security research center

The Carnegie Mellon CyLab Security and Privacy Institute is a computer security research center at Carnegie Mellon University.

== Overview ==
Founded in 2003 as a university-wide research center, it involves more than 50 faculty and 100 graduate students from different departments and schools within the university. It is "one of the largest university-based cyber security research and education centers in the U.S."

CyLab works with the CERT Coordination Center as well as US-CERT on matters relating to cybersecurity. The institute is often cited for its security and privacy research.

== picoCTF ==
picoCTF is a cybersecurity capture the flag competition hosted by CyLab. Established in 2013, the event is run annually over a period of two weeks and is geared towards high schoolers, billing itself as the largest high school cybersecurity event in the United States; the inaugural edition had 6,000 participants and 39,000 people competed in 2019. The challenges, which are modeled around real-life cybersecurity problems, are themed around a different storyline each year. The program aims to get high schoolers interested in computer security, offering cash prizes.

== See also ==
- Computer Security Institute
