= OPC Foundation =

Consortium for interfacing of industrial automation systems

The OPC Foundation (Open Platform Communications, formerly Object Linking and Embedding for Process Control) is an industry consortium that creates and maintains standards for open connectivity of industrial automation devices and systems, such as industrial control systems and process control generally. The OPC standards specify the communication of industrial process data, alarms and events, historical data and batch process data between sensors, instruments, controllers, software systems, and notification devices.

The OPC Foundation started in 1994, as a task force comprising five industrial automation vendors (Fisher-Rosemount, Rockwell Automation, Opto 22, Intellution, and Intuitive Technology), with the purpose of creating a basic OLE for Process Control specification. OLE is a technology developed by Microsoft Corporation for the MS Windows operating system. The task force released the OPC standard in August 1996. The OPC Foundation was chartered to continue development of interoperability specifications and includes manufacturers and users of devices instruments, controllers, software and enterprise systems.

The OPC Foundation cooperates with other organizations, such as MTConnect, who share similar missions.

== OPC standards and specification groups ==
OPC Data Access
This group of standards provides specifications for communicating real-time data from data acquisition devices such as PLCs to display and interface devices like Human-Machine Interfaces (HMI). The specifications focus on the continuous communication of data

OPC Alarms and Events
Standards for communicating alarm and event data on demand, as opposed to the continuous communications in the OPC Data Access group

OPC Batch
Standards to address the needs of batch processes

OPC Data eXchange
This group of standards addresses server to server communications across industrial networks. The standards also address remote configuration, diagnostics, monitoring and management communications

OPC Historical Data Access
Standards for communicating stored data

OPC Security
Standards for controlling client access to OPC compliant devices and systems

OPC XML-DA
Builds on the OPC Data Access specifications to communicate data in XML. Incorporates SOAP and Web services

OPC Complex Data
Standards for specifying the communication of complex data types such as binary data and XML documents

OPC Commands
Standards for communicating control commands to devices and systems

OPC Unified Architecture
An entirely new set of standards that incorporates all of the functionality of the above standards (and more), but does so using cross platform web services and other modern technology.

OPC Certification
The OPC Foundation has a well established Certification Process. The OPC Foundation calls this the OPC Enhanced Certification Program.

The OPC Foundation enhanced the range for certification of OPC product to meet the increasing demand for reliable functionality and insured interoperability. The self-certification using the ComplianceTestTool (CTT) and the participation at an Interoperability Workshop (IOP) are now enhanced with a Certification in an independent test facility. According to the test specification here not only the OPC Data Access (DA2/3) interface is tested but also the overall behavior of the product in a real world environment is verified. OPC Certification

== See also ==
- Object Linking and Embedding
