= Cybersecurity in popular culture =

Cybersecurity is an important topic in contemporary forms of popular culture, such as music, movies, television shows, and literature.

The depiction of cybersecurity in popular culture has evolved with the growth of Internet and computer technology. Early examples from the 1980s and 1990s include WarGames (1983), Neuromancer (1984), The Net (1995), Snow Crash (1992), and Hackers (1995). These works of fiction introduced the hacker archetype and explored virtual reality, artificial intelligence, and the ethical implications of hacking, as well as the risks of identity theft or cyberstalking.

In the 2000s, with the Internet becoming more prevalent, popular culture addressed the consequences of an interconnected world, including surveillance, privacy, and various forms of cybercrime, through shows such as Person of Interest (2011-2016) and Mr. Robot (2015-2019) and films such as Blackhat (2015).

== Literature ==
- Neuromancer (1984) by William Gibson
- Snow Crash (1992) by Neal Stephenson
- Cryptonomicon (1999) by Neal Stephenson

== Film ==
- Tron (1982) by Steven Lisberger
- WarGames (1983) by John Badham
- Sneakers (1992) by Phil Alden Robinson
- Hackers (1995) by Iain Softley
- The Net (1995) by Irwin Winkler
- Live Free or Die Hard (2007)
- Blackhat (2015) by Michael Mann

== Music ==
- "Encrypted & Vulnerable" (2019) by Saul Williams

== Television ==
- Mr. Robot (2015-2019)
- Person of Interest (2011-2016)
- CSI: Cyber (2015-2016)
- Scorpion (2014-2018)

== Video games ==
- Uplink (2001)
- Deus Ex series (2000-present)
- Watch Dogs series (2014-present)
- Hacknet (2015)
- Cyberpunk 2077 (2020)
