= Automation integrator =

Type of systems integrator

An automation integrator is a systems integrator company or individual who makes different versions of automation hardware and software work together, generally combining several subsystems to work together as one large system.

The title may refer to those who only integrate hardware, although these will often work with software integrators. Software created by automation integrators allows devices to communicate with each other, as well as collecting and reporting data.

The magazine Control Engineering publishes an annual “Automation Integrator Guide” which lists over 2,000 automation integrators. They also give an annual system integrator of the year award to three automation integration firms.

The Control System Integrators Association (CSIA) maintains a buyers' guide of over 1200 member and nonmember systems integrators known as the Industrial Automation Exchange, or CSIA Exchange for short.

== Certification ==
The Control System Integrators Association (CSIA) certifies automation integrators, through an audit based on 79 critical criteria from the best practices manual. Companies must be associate members of the CSIA to be eligible for certification. Integrators can also receive certification through a program launched in 2012 by the Robotics Industries Association.

== Industries ==
Automation Integrators work in a wide variety of industries which use robotics and automation. Some of the most common include:

- Automotive
- Water and Wastewater
- Manufacturing
- Packaging
- Electrical equipment
- Food and beverage
- HVAC Controls
- Oil and gas
- Chemicals
- Pharmaceuticals
- Power
- Utilities
