= JFreeChart =

Open-source framework for the programming language Java

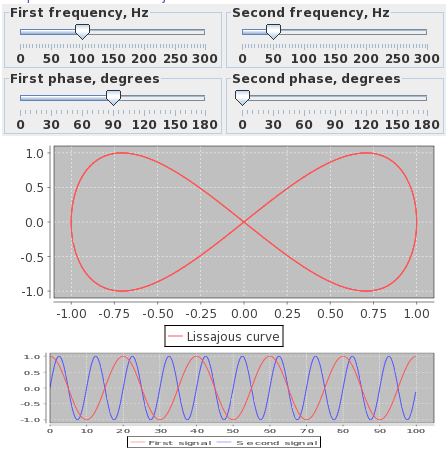
- Lissajous figures, implemented with JFreeChart
- Stable release: 1.5.6 / May 21, 2025; 17 months ago
- Written in: Java
- Operating system: Cross-platform (JVM)
- Type: Plotting Software
- License: LGPL
- Website: http://www.jfree.org/jfreechart/
- Repository: github.com/jfree/jfreechart

JFreeChart is an open-source framework for the programming language Java, which allows the creation of a wide variety of both interactive and non-interactive charts.

JFreeChart, developed by David Gilbert, is available under the terms of the LGPL license.

== Features ==
JFreeChart supports a number of various charts, including combined charts:

- X-Y charts (line, spline and scatter). Time axis is possible.
- Pie charts
- Gantt charts
- Bar charts (horizontal and vertical, stacked and independent). It also has built-in histogram plotting.
- Single valued (thermometer, compass, speedometer) that can then be placed over map.
- Various specific charts (wind chart, polar chart, bubbles of varying size).

It is possible to place various markers and annotations on the plot. JFreeChart automatically draws the axis scales and legends. Charts in GUI automatically get the capability to zoom with mouse and change some settings through local menus. The existing charts can be easily updated through the listeners that the library has on its data collections.

JFreeChart works with GNU Classpath, a free software implementation of the standard Java Class Library.

== Use in Software Applications ==
- Aperture Photometry Tool
- Eastwood Charts — an open-source implementation of the Google Chart API, with charts rendered using JFreeChart, developed by David Gilbert. Eastwood Charts is LGPL licensed.
- Isabelle
- Thoth: Software for Data Visualization and Statistics

== See also ==
- graph (Unix)
- List of information graphics software
