= Automation World =

American business magazine

- Categories: Business magazine
- Circulation: 56,336
- Publisher: Kurt Belisle
- Founded: 2003
- Company: PMMI Media Group, Inc.
- Based in: Chicago, Illinois, USA
- Language: English
- Website: automationworld.com

Launched in 2003 by PMMI Media Group (formerly Summit Media Group, Inc.), Automation World is a monthly publication which covers the latest developments in the automation field. Each issue contains articles in the following departments: Operations & Engineering Skills, Managers & Executives Skills, IT & Networking Skills. Feature articles, safety and security issues, industry news and a monthly Product World roundup are also included with monthly issues, along with one of three quarterly supplements - Industrial Ethernet Review, Packaging Automation Review, and Wireless World Review.

== History and profile ==
The first issue of Automation World was published in June 2003.

Director of Content and Editor-in-Chief David Greenfield and his editorial team cover the success of manufacturing through the implementation of automation, showcasing best practices and solutions for systems, software, networks and control products at the highest level.

As of December 2010, the audited BPA circulation of Automation World was 56,336 subscribers.
