= FreeTDS =

FreeTDS is a free software programming library, a re-implementation of the Tabular Data Stream protocol. It can be used in place of Sybase's db-lib or ct-lib libraries. It also includes an ODBC library. It allows many open source applications such as Perl and PHP (or any C or C++ program) to connect to Sybase ASE or Microsoft SQL Server.

FreeTDS is a source code library, not a program in and of itself. Users generally compile the library from source and link another program to the library to allow the other program to use the FreeTDS API. However, recent releases of FreeTDS do include some client programs, such as fisql (a replacement for the isql utility programs distributed by Sybase and Microsoft). FreeTDS is licensed under terms of the GNU Lesser General Public License.

For scripting languages, FreeTDS is used in conjunction with a module for that language such as DBD::Sybase in Perl, Python-Sybase for Python, or Ruby DBI for Ruby

jTDS is a Java implementation of FreeTDS, available on SourceForge. jBCP extends jTDS to include Sybase Bulk Copy Program (BCP) extensions.

== History ==
FreeTDS began in early 1997, when Brian Bruns started the project to run DB-Library programs on Linux and provide an open-source implementation of the TDS protocol. Early work focused on DB-Library and TDS 5.0, and later expanded to include a CT-Library-compatible layer, ODBC support, and newer TDS versions such as 7.0.
