= Distributed Component Object Model =

Software for communication between software components

Distributed Component Object Model (DCOM) is a proprietary Microsoft technology for communication between software components on networked computers. DCOM, which originally was called "Network OLE", extends Microsoft's COM, and provides the communication substrate under Microsoft's COM+ application server infrastructure.

The extension COM into Distributed COM was due to extensive use of DCE/RPC (Distributed Computing Environment/Remote Procedure Calls) – more specifically Microsoft's enhanced version, known as MSRPC.

In terms of the extensions it added to COM, DCOM had to solve the problems of:

- Marshalling – serializing and deserializing the arguments and return values of method calls "over the wire".
- Distributed garbage collection – ensuring that references held by clients of interfaces are released when, for example, the client process crashed, or the network connection was lost.
- Combining significant numbers of objects in the client's browser into a single transmission in order to minimize bandwidth utilization.

One of the key factors in solving these problems is the use of DCE/RPC as the underlying RPC mechanism behind DCOM. DCE/RPC has strictly defined rules regarding marshalling and who is responsible for freeing memory.

DCOM was a major competitor to CORBA. Proponents of both of these technologies saw them as one day becoming the model for code and service-reuse over the Internet. However, the difficulties involved in getting either of these technologies to work over Internet firewalls, and on unknown and insecure machines, meant that normal HTTP requests in combination with web browsers won out over both of them. Microsoft, at one point, attempted to remediate these shortcomings by adding an extra HTTP transport to DCE/RPC called ncacn_http (Network Computing Architecture connection-oriented protocol).

DCOM was publicly launched as a beta for Windows 95 September 18, 1996.

DCOM is supported natively in all versions of Windows starting from Windows 95, and all versions of Windows Server since Windows NT 4.0

== Security improvements ==
As part of the initiative that began at Microsoft as part of Secure Development Lifecycle to re-architect insecure code, DCOM saw some significant security-focused changes in Windows XP Service Pack 2.

In response to a security vulnerability reported by Tencent Security Xuanwu Lab in June 2021, Microsoft released security updates for several versions of Windows and Windows Server, hardening access to DCOM.

== Alternative versions and implementations ==
COMsource is a Unix based implementation of DCOM, allowing interoperability between different platforms. Its source code is available, along with full and complete documentation, sufficient to use and also implement an interoperable version of DCOM. COMsource comes directly from the Windows NT 4.0 source code, and includes the source code for a Windows NT Registry Service.

In 1995, Digital and Microsoft announced Affinity for OpenVMS (also known as NT Affinity) which was intended to allow OpenVMS to serve as the persistence layer for Windows NT client-server applications. As part of this initiative, an implementation of the Distributed Component Object Model (DCOM) was added to OpenVMS Alpha. In order to support DCOM, VMS was provided with implementations of the Windows Registry, NTLM authentication, and a subset of Win32 APIs needed to support COM. DCOM was first added to OpenVMS V7.2-1 for the Alpha. A similar implementation of DCOM was added to Digital Unix as part of the AllConnect program.

TangramCOM was a separate project from Wine, focusing on implementing DCOM on Linux-based smartphones.

== See also ==
- ActiveX
- Dynamic Data Exchange (DDE)
- .NET Remoting
- OLE for Process Control
