= Machine to machine =

Communication between devices

Machine to machine (M2M) is direct communication between devices using any communications channel, including wired and Wireless. M2M communication can include industrial instrumentation, where a sensor communicates the data it records (such as temperature or inventory level), as well as telematics, which uses M2M to enable a fleet telematics system to monitor mobile assets. Such communication was originally accomplished by having a remote network of machines relay information back to a central hub for analysis, which would then be rerouted into a system like a personal computer.

More recent machine to machine communication has changed into a system of networks that transmits data to personal appliances. The expansion of IP networks has made M2M communication quicker and easier while using less power, and it is a component of the Internet of Things (IoT). These networks also allow new business opportunities for consumers and suppliers.

== History ==
Wired communication machines have been using signaling to exchange information since the early 20th century. Machine to machine has taken more sophisticated forms since the advent of computer networking automation and predates cellular communication. It has been utilized in applications such as telemetry, industrial, automation, and SCADA.

Machine to machine devices that combined telephony and computing were first conceptualized by Theodore Paraskevakos while working on his Caller ID system in 1968, later patented in the U.S. in 1973. This system, similar but distinct from the panel call indicator of the 1920s and automatic number identification of the 1940s, which communicated telephone numbers to machines, was the predecessor to what is now caller ID, which communicates numbers to people.

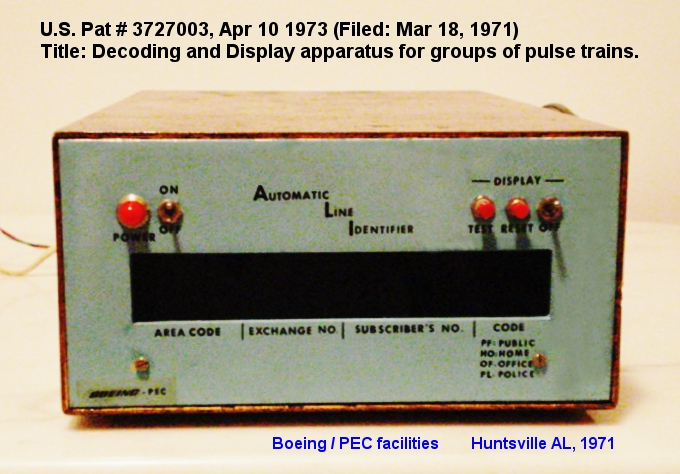
The first caller identification receiver

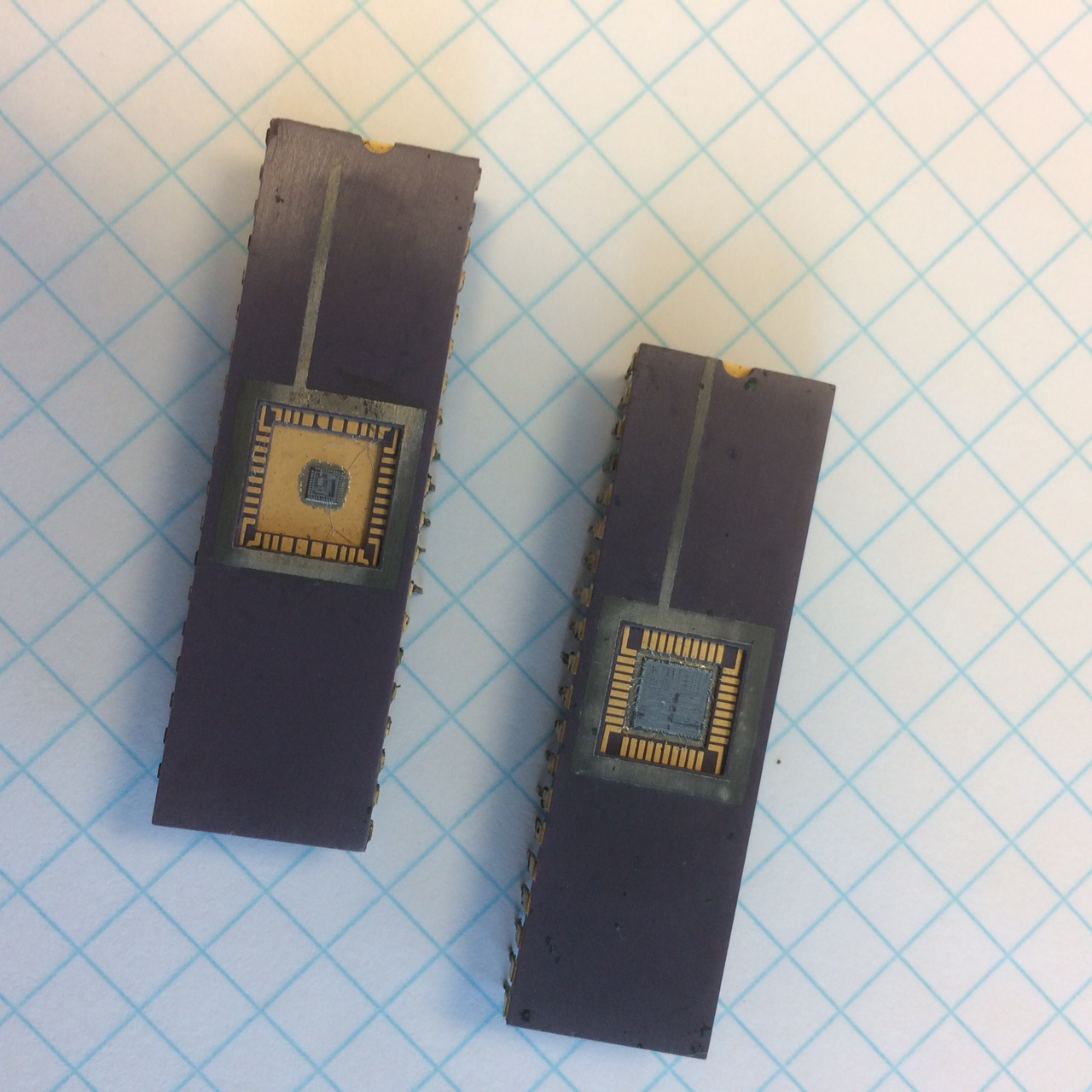
Processing Chips

After several attempts and experiments, he realized that in order for the telephone to be able to read the caller's telephone number, it must possess intelligence so he developed the method in which the caller's number is transmitted to the called receiver's device. His portable transmitter and receiver were reduced to practice in 1971 in a Boeing facility in Huntsville, Alabama, representing the world's first working prototypes of caller identification devices (shown at right). They were installed at Peoples' Telephone Company in Leesburg, Alabama and in Athens, Greece where they were demonstrated to several telephone companies with great success. This method was the basis for modern-day Caller ID technology. He was also the first to introduce the concepts of intelligence, data processing and visual display screens into telephones which gave rise to the smartphone.

In 1977, Paraskevakos started Metretek, Inc. in Melbourne, Florida to conduct commercial automatic meter reading and load management for electrical services which led to the "smart grid" and "smart meter". To achieve mass appeal, Paraskevakos sought to reduce the size of the transmitter and the time of transmission through telephone lines by creating a single chip processing and transmission method. Motorola was contracted in 1978 to develop and produce the single chip, but the chip was too large for Motorola's capabilities at that time. As a result, it became two separate chips (shown at right).

While cellular is becoming more common, many machines still use landlines (POTS, DSL, cable) to connect to the IP network. The cellular M2M communications industry emerged in 1995 when Siemens set up a department inside its mobile phones business unit to develop and launch a GSM data module called "M1" based on the Siemens mobile phone S6 for M2M industrial applications, enabling machines to communicate over wireless networks. The first M1 module was used for early point of sale (POS) terminals, in vehicle telematics, remote monitoring and track and trace applications. Machine to machine technology was first embraced by early implementers such as GM and Hughes Electronics Corporation who realized the benefits and future potential of the technology. By 1997, machine to machine wireless technology became more prevalent and sophisticated as ruggedized modules were developed and launched for the specific needs of different vertical markets such as automotive telematics.

21st century machine to machine data modules have newer features and capabilities such as onboard global positioning (GPS) technology, flexible land grid array surface mounting, embedded machine to machine optimized smart cards (like phone SIMs) known as MIMs or machine to machine identification modules, and embedded Java, an important enabling technology to accelerate the Internet of things (IOT). Another example of an early use is OnStar's vehicle tracking system.

The hardware components of a machine to machine network are manufactured by a few key players. In 1998, Quake Global started designing and manufacturing machine to machine satellite and terrestrial modems. Initially relying heavily on the Orbcomm network for its satellite communication services, Quake Global expanded its telecommunication product offerings by engaging both satellite and terrestrial networks, which gave Quake Global an edge in offering network-neutral products.

=== In the 2000s ===
In 2004, Digi International began producing wireless gateways and routers. Shortly after in 2006, Digi purchased Max Stream, the manufacturer of XBee radios. These hardware components allowed users to connect machines no matter how remote their location. Since then, Digi has partnered with several companies to connect hundreds of thousands of devices around the world.

In 2004, Christopher Lowery, a UK telecoms entrepreneur, founded Wyless Group, one of the first Mobile Virtual Network Operators (MVNO) in the M2M space. Operations began in the UK and Lowery published several patents introducing new features in data protection & management, including Fixed IP Addressing combined with Platform Managed Connectivity over VPNs. The company expanded to the US in 2008 and became T-Mobile's largest partners on both sides of the Atlantic.

In 2006, Machine-to-Machine Intelligence (M2Mi) Corp started work with NASA to develop automated machine to machine intelligence. Automated machine to machine intelligence enables a wide variety of mechanisms including wired or wireless tools, sensors, devices, server computers, robots, spacecraft and grid systems to communicate and exchange information efficiently.

In 2009, AT&T and Jasper Technologies, Inc. entered into an agreement to support the creation of machine to machine devices jointly. They have stated that they will be trying to drive further connectivity between consumer electronics and machine to machine wireless networks, which would create a boost in speed and overall power of such devices. 2009 also saw the introduction of real-time management of GSM and CDMA network services for machine to machine applications with the launch of the PRiSMPro™ Platform from machine to machine network provider KORE Telematics. The platform focused on making multi-network management a critical component for efficiency improvements and cost-savings in machine to machine device and network usage.

Also in 2009, Wyless Group introduced PORTHOS™, its multi-operator, multi-application, device agnostic Open Data Management Platform. The company introduced a new industry definition, Global Network Enabler, comprising customer-facing platform management of networks, devices and applications.

Also in 2009, the Norwegian incumbent Telenor concluded ten years of machine to machine research by setting up two entities serving the upper (services) and lower (connectivity) parts of the value-chain. Telenor Connexion in Sweden draws on Vodafone's former research capabilities in subsidiary Europolitan and is in Europe's market for services across such typical markets as logistics, fleet management, car safety, healthcare, and smart metering of electricity consumption. Telenor Objects has a similar role supplying connectivity to machine to machine networks across Europe. In the UK, Business MVNO Abica, commenced trials with Telehealth and Telecare applications which required secure data transit via Private APN and HSPA+/4G LTE connectivity with static IP address.

=== In the 2010s ===
In early 2010 in the U.S., AT&T, KPN, Rogers, Telcel / America Movil and Jasper Technologies, Inc. began to work together in the creation of a machine to machine site, which will serve as a hub for developers in the field of machine to machine communication electronics. In January 2011, Aeris Communications, Inc. announced that it is providing machine to machine telematics services for Hyundai Motor Corporation. Partnerships like these make it easier, faster and more cost-efficient for businesses to use machine to machine. In June 2010, mobile messaging operator Tyntec announced the availability of its high-reliability SMS services for M2M applications.

In March 2011, machine to machine network service provider KORE Wireless teamed with Vodafone Group and Iridium Communications Inc., respectively, to make KORE Global Connect network services available via cellular and satellite connectivity in more than 180 countries, with a single point for billing, support, logistics and relationship management. Later that year, KORE acquired Australia-based Mach Communications Pty Ltd. in response to increased Machine to Machine demand within Asia-Pacific markets.

In April 2011, Ericsson acquired Telenor Connexion's machine to machine platform, in an effort to get more technology and know-how in the growing sector.

In August 2011, Ericsson announced that they have successfully completed the asset purchase agreement to acquire Telenor Connexion's (machine to machine) technology platform.

According to the independent wireless analyst firm Berg Insight, the number of cellular network connections worldwide used for machine to machine communication was 47.7 million in 2008. The company forecasts that the number of machine to machine connections will grow to 187 million by 2014.

A research study from the E-Plus Group shows that in 2010 2.3 million machine to machine smart cards will be in the German market. According to the study, this figure will rise in 2013 to over 5 million smart cards. The main growth driver is segment "tracking and tracing" with an expected average growth rate of 30 percent. The fastest growing M2M segment in Germany, with an average annual growth of 47 percent, will be the consumer electronics segment.

In April 2013, OASIS MQTT standards group is formed with the goal of working on a lightweight publish/subscribe reliable messaging transport protocol suitable for communication in M2M/IoT contexts. IBM and StormMQ chair this standards group and Machine-to-Machine Intelligence (M2Mi) Corp is the secretary. In May 2014, the committee published the MQTT and NIST Cybersecurity Framework Version 1.0 committee note to provide guidance for organizations wishing to deploy MQTT in a way consistent with the NIST Framework for Improving Critical Infrastructure Cybersecurity.

In May 2013, machine to machine network service providers KORE Telematics, Oracle, Deutsche Telekom, Digi International, Orbcomm and Telit formed the International Machine to Machine Council (IMC). The first trade organization to service the entire machine to machine ecosystem, the IMC aims at making machine to machine ubiquitous by helping companies install and manage the communication between machines.

== Applications ==
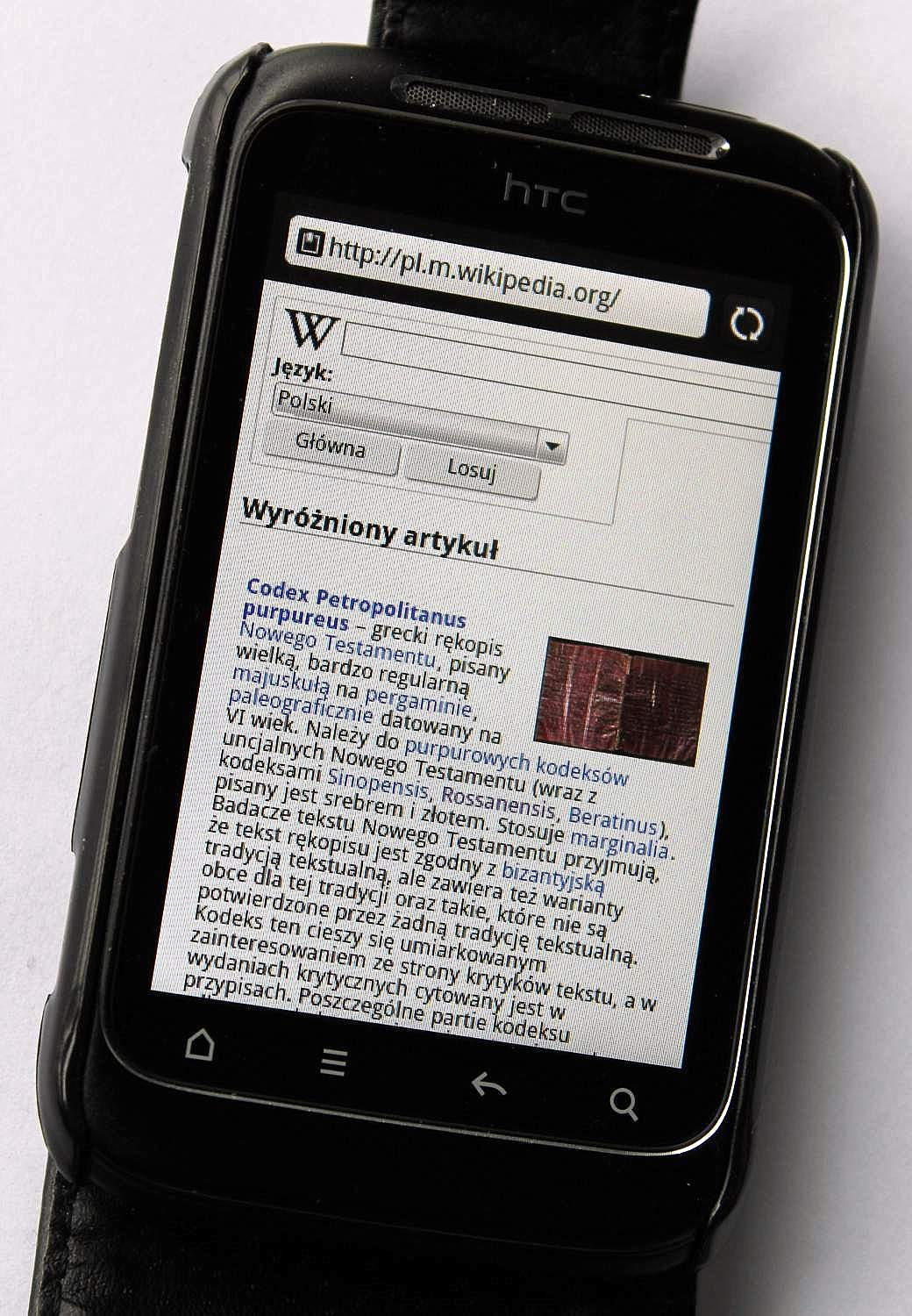
Commonplace consumer application

Wireless networks that are all interconnected can serve to improve production and efficiency in various areas, including machinery that works on building cars and on letting the developers of products know when certain products need to be taken in for maintenance and for what reason. Such information serves to streamline products that consumers buy and works to keep them all working at highest efficiency.

Another application is to use wireless technology to monitor systems, such as utility meters. This would allow the owner of the meter to know if certain elements have been tampered with, which serves as a quality method to stop fraud. In Quebec, Rogers will connect Hydro Quebec's central system with up to 600 Smart Meter collectors, which aggregate data relayed from the province's 3.8-million Smart Meters. In the UK, Telefónica won on a €1.78 billion ($2.4 billion) smart-meter contract to provide connectivity services over a period of 15 years in the central and southern regions of the country. The contract is the industry's biggest deal yet. Some companies, such as M-kopa in Kenya, are using M2M to enforce a payment plan, by turning off its customers' solar devices remotely for non-payment. "Our loan officer is that SIM card in the device that can shut it off remotely," says Chad Larson, M-Kopa's finance director and its third co-founder, when describing the technology.

A third application is to use wireless networks to update digital billboards. This allows advertisers to display different messages based on time of day or day-of-week, and allows quick global changes for messages, such as pricing changes for gasoline.

The industrial machine to machine market is undergoing a transformation as enterprises are utilizing connecting geographically dispersed people, devices, sensors and machines to corporate networks. Today, industries such as oil and gas, precision agriculture, military, government, smart cities, manufacturing, and public utilities, among others, utilize machine to machine technologies for different applications. Companies have enabled data networking technologies to provide capabilities such as high-speed data transmission, mobile mesh networking, and 3G/4G cellular backhaul.

Telematics and in-vehicle entertainment is an area of focus for machine to machine developers. Recent examples include Ford Motor Company, which has teamed with AT&T to wirelessly connect Ford Focus Electric with an embedded wireless connection and dedicated app that includes the ability for the owner to monitor and control vehicle charge settings, plan single- or multiple-stop journeys, locate charging stations, pre-heat or cool the car. In 2011, Audi partnered with T-Mobile and RACO Wireless to offer Audi Connect. Audi Connect allows users access to news, weather, and fuel prices while turning the vehicle into a secure mobile Wi-Fi hotspot, allowing passengers access to the Internet.

== Networks in prognostics and health management ==
Machine to machine wireless networks can serve to improve the production and efficiency of machines, to enhance the reliability and safety of complex systems, and to promote the life-cycle management for key assets and products. By applying Prognostic and Health Management (PHM) techniques in machine networks, the following goals can be achieved or improved:

- Near-zero downtime performance of machines and system;
- Health management of a fleet of similar machines.

The application of intelligent analysis tools and Device-to-Business (D2B) TM informatics platform form the basis of e-maintenance machine network that can lead to near-zero downtime performance of machines and systems. The e-maintenance machine network provides integration between the factory floor system and e-business system, and thus enables the real time decision making in terms of near-zero downtime, reducing uncertainties and improved system performance. In addition, with the help of highly interconnected machine networks and advance intelligent analysis tools, several novel maintenance types are made possible nowadays. For instance, the distant maintenance without dispatching engineers on-site, the online maintenance without shutting down the operating machines or systems, and the predictive maintenance before a machine failure become catastrophic. All these benefits of e-maintenance machine network add up improve the maintenance efficiency and transparency significantly.

As described in, The framework of e-maintenance machine network consists of sensors, data acquisition system, communication network, analytic agents, decision-making support knowledge base, information synchronization interface and e-business system for decision making. Initially, the sensors, controllers and operators with data acquisition are used to collect the raw data from equipment and send it out to Data Transformation Layer automatically via internet or intranet. The Data Transform Layer then employs signal processing tools and feature extraction methods to convert the raw data into useful information. This converted information often carries rich information about the reliability and availability of machines or system and is more agreeable for intelligent analysis tools to perform subsequent process. The Synchronization Module and Intelligent Tools comprise the major processing power of the e-maintenance machine network and provide optimization, prediction, clustering, classification, bench-marking and so on. The results from this module can then be synchronized and shared with the e-business system on for decision making. In real application, the synchronization module will provide connection with other departments at the decision making level, like enterprise resource planning (ERP), customer relation management (CRM) and supply chain management (SCM).

Another application of machine to machine network is in the health management for a fleet of similar machines using clustering approach. This method was introduced to address the challenge of developing fault detection models for applications with non-stationary operating regimes or with incomplete data. The overall methodology consists of two stages: 1) Fleet Clustering to group similar machines for sound comparison; 2) Local Cluster Fault Detection to evaluate the similarity of individual machines to the fleet features. The purpose of fleet clustering is to aggregate working units with similar configurations or working conditions into a group for sound comparison and subsequently create local fault detection models when global models cannot be established. Within the framework of peer to peer comparison methodology, the machine to machine network is crucial to ensure the instantaneous information share between different working units and thus form the basis of fleet level health management technology.

The fleet level health management using clustering approach was patented for its application in wind turbine health monitoring after validated in a wind turbine fleet of three distributed wind farms. Different with other industrial devices with fixed or static regimes, wind turbine's operating condition is greatly dictated by wind speed and other ambient factors. Even though the multi-modeling methodology can be applicable in this scenario, the number of wind turbines in a wind farm is almost infinite and may not present itself as a practical solution. Instead, by leveraging on data generated from other similar turbines in the network, this problem can be properly solved and local fault detection models can be effective built. The results of wind turbine fleet level health management reported in demonstrated the effectiveness of applying a cluster-based fault detection methodology in the wind turbine networks.

Fault detection for a horde of industrial robots experiences similar difficulties as lack of fault detection models and dynamic operating condition. Industrial robots are crucial in automotive manufacturing and perform different tasks as welding, material handling, painting, etc. In this scenario, robotic maintenance becomes critical to ensure continuous production and avoid downtime. Historically, the fault detection models for all the industrial robots are trained similarly. Critical model parameters like training samples, components, and alarming limits are set the same for all the units regardless of their different functionalities. Even though these identical fault detection models can effectively identify faults sometimes, numerous false alarms discourage users from trusting the reliability of the system. However, within a machine network, industrial robots with similar tasks or working regimes can be group together; the abnormal units in a cluster can then be prioritized for maintenance via training based or instantaneous comparison. This peer to peer comparison methodology inside a machine network could improve the fault detection accuracy significantly.

== Open initiatives ==
- Eclipse machine to machine industry working group (open communication protocols, tools, and frameworks), the umbrella of various projects including Koneki, Eclipse SCADA
- ITU-T Focus Group M2M (global standardization initiative for a common M2M service layer)
- 3GPP studies security aspects for machine to machine (M2M) equipment, in particular automatic SIM activation covering remote provisioning and change of subscription.
- Weightless – standard group focusing on using TV "white space" for M2M
- XMPP (Jabber) protocol
- OASIS MQTT – standards group working on a lightweight publish/subscribe reliable messaging transport protocol suitable for communication in M2M/IoT contexts.
- Open Mobile Alliance (OMA_LWM2M) protocol
- RPMA (Ingenu)
- Industrial Internet Consortium

== See also ==
- Plant floor communication
- Process driven messaging service
- Protocol converter
- Smart, connected products
- Universal gateway
