= Enterprise resource planning =

Corporate task of optimizing the existing resources in a company

Diagram showing some typical ERP modules

Enterprise resource planning (ERP) is the integrated management of main business processes, often in real time and mediated by software and technology. ERP is usually referred to as a category of business management software typically a suite of integrated applications that an organization can use to collect, store, manage and interpret data from many business activities.

The finance module in particular is essential to a suite of applications meeting the definition of an ERP system. The finance module provides the system of record for the organisation; recording the commercial impact of the business operations in the General Ledger.

ERP systems can be local-based or cloud-based. Cloud-based applications have grown rapidly since the early 2010s due to the increased efficiencies arising from information being readily available from any location with Internet access. However, ERP differs from integrated business management systems by including planning all resources that are required in the future to meet business objectives. This includes plans for getting suitable staff and manufacturing capabilities for future needs.

ERP provides an integrated and continuously updated view of core business processes, typically using a shared database managed by a database management system. ERP systems track business resources cash, raw materials, production capacity and the status of business commitments: orders, purchase orders, and payroll. The applications that make up the system share data across various departments (manufacturing, purchasing, sales, accounting, etc.) that provide the data. ERP facilitates information flow between all business functions and manages connections to outside stakeholders.

Estimates of the size of the global ERP market range between US$78 and US$81 billion in 2026. Though early ERP systems focused on large enterprises, smaller enterprises increasingly use ERP systems.

The ERP system integrates varied organizational systems and facilitates error-free transactions and production, thereby enhancing the organization's efficiency. However, developing an ERP system differs from traditional system development. ERP systems run on a variety of computer hardware and network configurations, typically using a database as an information repository.

== History ==
=== Origination ===
Business and technology research and advisory firm Gartner is credited for first using the acronym ERP in the 1990s. The term captured a functional extension of two manufacturing-based concepts, material requirements planning (MRP) and manufacturing resource planning (MRP II). Without replacing these terms, ERP came to represent a larger whole that reflected the evolution of application integration beyond manufacturing.

Not all ERP packages are developed from a manufacturing core; ERP vendors variously began assembling their packages with finance-and-accounting, maintenance, and human-resource components. By the mid-1990s ERP systems addressed all core enterprise functions. Governments and non–profit organizations also began to use ERP systems. An "ERP system selection methodology" is a formal process for selecting an enterprise resource planning (ERP) system. Existing methodologies include: Kuiper's funnel method, Dobrin's three-dimensional (3D) web-based decision support tool, and the Clarkston Potomac methodology.

=== Expansion ===
ERP systems experienced rapid growth in the 1990s. Because of the year 2000 problem many companies took the opportunity to replace their old systems with ERP.

ERP systems initially focused on automating back office functions that did not directly affect customers and the public. Front office functions, such as customer relationship management (CRM), dealt directly with customers, or e-business systems such as e-commerce and e-government—or supplier relationship management (SRM) became integrated later, when the internet simplified communicating with external parties.

"ERP II" was coined in 2000 in an article by Gartner Publications entitled ERP Is Dead Long Live ERP II. It describes web–based software that provides real–time access to ERP systems to employees and partners (such as suppliers and customers). The ERP II role expands traditional ERP resource optimization and transaction processing. Rather than just manage buying, selling, etc. ERP II leverages information in the resources under its management to help the enterprise collaborate with other enterprises. ERP II is more flexible than the first generation ERP. Rather than confine ERP system capabilities within the organization, it goes beyond the corporate walls to interact with other systems. Enterprise application suite is an alternate name for such systems. ERP II systems are typically used to enable collaborative initiatives such as supply chain management (SCM), customer relationship management (CRM) and business intelligence (BI) among business partner organizations through the use of various electronic business technologies. The large proportion of companies are pursuing a strong managerial targets in ERP system instead of acquire an ERP company.

Developers now make more effort to integrate mobile devices with the ERP system. ERP vendors are extending ERP to these devices, along with other business applications, so that businesses do not have to rely on third-party applications. As an example, the e-commerce platform Shopify was able to make ERP tools from Microsoft and Oracle available on its app in October 2021.

Technical stakes of modern ERP concern integration hardware, applications, networking, supply chains. ERP now covers more functions and roles including decision making, stakeholders' relationships, standardization, transparency, globalization, etc.

From 1999 the ERP industry underwent a paradigm shift from the existing on-premise model (i.e. separate installations of the ERP system on the client's or third-party servers) to cloud (i.e. the ERP system is served to the user via a web browser with all of its components hosted in data centres). This followed the launch of early pure cloud ERP systems such as NetLedger. This shift required massive technology and business model changes from the ERP vendors.

=== Postmodern ERP ===
The term "postmodern ERP" was coined by Gartner in 2013, when it first appeared in the paper series "Predicts 2014". According to Gartner's definition of the postmodern ERP strategy, legacy, monolithic and highly customized ERP suites, in which all parts are heavily reliant on each other, should sooner or later be replaced by a mixture of both cloud-based and on-premises applications, which are more loosely coupled and can be easily exchanged if needed.

The basic idea is that there should still be a core ERP solution that would cover most important business functions, while other functions will be covered by specialist software solutions that merely extend the core ERP. This concept is similar to the "best-of-breed" approach to software execution, but it shouldn't be confused with it. While in both cases, applications that make up the whole are relatively loosely connected and quite easily interchangeable, in the case of the latter there is no ERP solution whatsoever. Instead, every business function is covered by a separate software solution.

There is, however, no golden rule as to what business functions should be part of the core ERP, and what should be covered by supplementary solutions. According to Gartner, every company must define their own postmodern ERP strategy, based on company's internal and external needs, operations and processes. For example, a company may define that the core ERP solution should cover those business processes that must stay behind the firewall, and therefore, choose to leave their core ERP on-premises. At the same time, another company may adopt a hybrid ERP approach, hosting the core ERP solution in the cloud while moving only a few ERP modules as supplementary solutions to on-premises.

The main benefits that companies will gain from implementing postmodern ERP strategy are speed and flexibility when reacting to unexpected changes in business processes or on the organizational level. With the majority of applications having a relatively loose connection, it is fairly easy to replace or upgrade them whenever necessary. In addition to that, following the examples above, companies can select and combine cloud-based and on-premises solutions that are most suited for their ERP needs. The downside of postmodern ERP is that it will most likely lead to an increased number of software vendors that companies will have to manage, as well as pose additional integration challenges for the central IT.

=== AI impact on ERP ===
In 2026 the impact of AI on the ERP industry is still an open question. According to the McKinsey & Company May 2026 paper "The end of ERP as we know it? Five ways AI is disrupting ERP" AI is not merely enhancing traditional ERP systems but fundamentally reshaping them; "The question is not whether AI will affect the familiar ERP paradigm but rather how radically and how quickly the shift will happen." (sic)

Various outcomes envisaged in the paper include: the complete replacement of traditional ERP systems with agentic AI systems; the continued use of ERP systems as a stable backend with users interacting with AI agents as the user interface; ERP systems incorporating AI in order to drive continuous efficiency and optimisation in ERP use; AI incorporation will make implementations faster and cheaper; AI incorporation will reduce the reliance on specialist system integrators for implementation and deliver more value directly from the ERP vendor to the customer and AI incorporation will reduce the attractiveness of customisation and drive more use of off-the-shelf ERP functionality.

== Functional areas ==
An ERP system covers the following common functional areas. In many ERP systems, these are called and grouped together as ERP modules:

- Financial accounting: general ledger, fixed assets, payables including vouchering, matching and payment, receivables and collections, cash management, financial consolidation
- Management accounting: budgeting, costing, cost management, activity based costing, billing, invoicing (optional)
- Human resources: recruiting, training, rostering, payroll, benefits, retirement and pension plans, diversity management, retirement, separation
- Manufacturing: engineering, bill of materials, work orders, scheduling, capacity, workflow management, quality control, manufacturing process, manufacturing projects, manufacturing flow, product life cycle management
- Order processing: order to cash, order entry, credit checking, pricing, available to promise, inventory, shipping, sales analysis and reporting, sales commissioning
- Supply chain management: supply chain planning, supplier scheduling, product configurator, order to cash, purchasing, inventory, claim processing, warehousing (receiving, putaway, picking and packing)
- Project management: project planning, resource planning, project costing, work breakdown structure, billing, time and expense, performance units, activity management
- Customer relationship management (CRM): sales and marketing, commissions, service, customer contact, call center support – CRM systems are not always considered part of ERP systems but rather business support systems (BSS)
- Supplier relationship management (SRM): suppliers, orders, payments.
- Data services: various "self-service" interfaces for customers, suppliers or employees
- Management of school and educational institutes.
- Contract management: creating, monitoring, and managing contracts, reducing administrative burdens and minimising legal risks. These modules often feature contract templates, electronic signature capabilities, automated alerts for contract milestones, and advanced search functionality.

=== GRP – ERP use in government ===
Government resource planning (GRP) is the equivalent of an ERP for the public sector and an integrated office automation system for government bodies. The software structure, modularization, core algorithms and main interfaces do not differ from other ERPs, and ERP software suppliers manage to adapt their systems to government agencies.

Both system implementations, in private and public organizations, are adopted to improve productivity and overall business performance in organizations, but comparisons (private vs. public) of implementations shows that the main factors influencing ERP implementation success in the public sector are cultural.

== Best practice ==
Most ERP systems incorporate best practices. This means the software reflects the vendor's interpretation of the most effective way to perform each business process. Systems vary in how conveniently the customer can modify these practices.

Use of best practices eases compliance with requirements such as International Financial Reporting Standards, Sarbanes–Oxley, or Basel II. They can also help comply with de facto industry standards, such as electronic funds transfer. This is because the procedure can be readily codified within the ERP software and replicated with confidence across multiple businesses that share that business requirement.

=== Connectivity to plant floor information ===
ERP systems connect to real–time data and transaction data in a variety of ways. These systems are typically configured by systems integrators, who bring unique knowledge on process, equipment, and vendor solutions.

Direct integration – ERP systems have connectivity (communications to plant floor equipment) as part of their product offering. This requires that the vendors offer specific support for the plant floor equipment their customers operate.

Database integration – ERP systems connect to plant floor data sources through staging tables in a database. Plant floor systems deposit the necessary information into the database. The ERP system reads the information in the table. The benefit of staging is that ERP vendors do not need to master the complexities of equipment integration. Connectivity becomes the responsibility of the systems integrator.

Enterprise appliance transaction modules (EATM) – These devices communicate directly with plant floor equipment and with the ERP system via methods supported by the ERP system. EATM can employ a staging table, web services, or system–specific program interfaces (APIs). An EATM offers the benefit of being an off–the–shelf solution.

Custom–integration solutions – Many system integrators offer custom solutions. These systems tend to have the highest level of initial integration cost, and can have a higher long term maintenance and reliability costs. Long term costs can be minimized through careful system testing and thorough documentation. Custom–integrated solutions typically run on workstation or server-class computers.

== Two-tier enterprise resource planning ==
Two-tier ERP software and hardware lets companies run the equivalent of two ERP systems at once: one at the corporate level and one at the division or subsidiary level. For example, a manufacturing company could use an ERP system to manage across the organization using independent global or regional distribution, production or sales centers, and service providers to support the main company's customers. Each independent center (or) subsidiary may have its own business operations cycles, workflows, and business processes.

Given the realities of globalization, enterprises continuously evaluate how to optimize their regional, divisional, and product or manufacturing strategies to support strategic goals and reduce time-to-market while increasing profitability and delivering value. With two-tier ERP, the regional distribution, production, or sales centers and service providers continue operating under their own business model—separate from the main company, using their own ERP systems. Since these smaller companies' processes and workflows are not tied to main company's processes and workflows, they can respond to local business requirements in multiple locations.

Factors that affect enterprises' adoption of two-tier ERP systems include:

- Manufacturing globalization, the economics of sourcing in emerging economies
- Potential for quicker, less costly ERP implementations at subsidiaries, based on selecting software more suited to smaller companies
- Extra effort, (often involving the use of enterprise application integration) is required where data must pass between two ERP systems Two-tier ERP strategies give enterprises agility in responding to market demands and in aligning IT systems at a corporate level while inevitably resulting in more systems as compared to one ERP system used throughout the organization.

An alternative to a two-tier approach is to use as an ERP system which allows for multiple workflows to be configured for the same function. This allows each operation or division to have its own workflow, say for order entry. This avoids the need to integrate two ERP systems as all divisions and operations are running within the same ERP system.

== Implementation ==
ERP's scope usually implies significant changes to staff work processes and practices. Generally, three types of services are available to help implement such changes: consulting, customization, and support. Implementation time depends on business size, number of modules, customization, the scope of process changes, and the readiness of the customer to take ownership for the project. Modular ERP systems can be implemented in stages. The typical project for a large enterprise takes about 14 months and requires around 150 consultants. Small projects can require months; multinational and other large implementations can take years. Customization can substantially increase implementation times.

Besides that, information processing influences various business functions e.g. some large corporations like Walmart use a just in time inventory system. This reduces inventory storage and increases delivery efficiency, and requires up-to-date data. Before 2014, Walmart used a system called Inforem developed by IBM to manage replenishment.

=== Project methodology ===
The outcome of the implementation process will be significantly impacted by the skills and experience of the implementing team combined with a tried and tested implementation methodology that provides guardrails to drive the project to success. ERP implementations are a specific sub-type of project however there is no industry-specified standard methodology. Implementation methodologies are created by the ERP vendors or the specialist ERP consulting firms, generally known as Value Added Resellers (VARs), who carry out the implementations. Each implementer's methodology can be assessed as to how well it meets the principles and practices outlined in the guides of the project management peak industry bodies such as Project Management Institute.

=== Process preparation ===
Implementing ERP typically requires changes in existing business processes. Poor understanding of needed process changes prior to starting implementation is a main reason for project failure. The difficulties could be related to the system, business process, infrastructure, training, or lack of motivation.

It is therefore crucial that organizations thoroughly analyze processes before they deploy an ERP software. Analysis can identify opportunities for process modernization. It also enables an assessment of the alignment of current processes with those provided by the ERP system. Research indicates that risk of business process mismatch is decreased by:

- Linking current processes to the organization's strategy
- Analyzing the effectiveness of each process
- Understanding existing automated solutions

ERP implementation is considerably more difficult (and politically charged) in decentralized organizations, because they often have different processes, business rules, data semantics, authorization hierarchies, and decision centers. This may require migrating some business units before others, delaying implementation to work through the necessary changes for each unit, possibly reducing integration (e.g., linking via master data management) or customizing the system to meet specific needs.

A potential disadvantage is that adopting "standard" processes can lead to a loss of competitive advantage. While this has happened, losses in one area are often offset by gains in other areas, increasing overall competitive advantage.

=== Configuration ===
Configuring an ERP system is largely a matter of balancing the way the organization wants the system to work, and the way the system is designed to work out of the box. ERP systems typically include many configurable settings that in effect modify system operations. For example, in the ServiceNow platform, business rules can be written requiring the signature of a business owner within 2 weeks of a newly completed risk assessment. The tool can be configured to automatically email notifications to the business owner, and transition the risk assessment to various stages in the process depending on the owner's responses or lack thereof.

=== Customization ===
ERP systems are theoretically based on industry best practices, and their makers intend that organizations deploy them "as is". ERP vendors do offer customers configuration options that let organizations incorporate their own business rules, but gaps in features often remain even after configuration is complete.

ERP customers have several options to reconcile feature gaps, each with their own pros/cons. Technical solutions include rewriting part of the delivered software, writing a homegrown module to work within the ERP system, or interfacing to an external system. These three options constitute varying degrees of system customization—with the first being the most invasive and costly to maintain. Alternatively, there are non-technical options such as changing business practices or organizational policies to better match the delivered ERP feature set. Key differences between customization and configuration include:

- Customization is always optional, whereas the software must always be configured before use (e.g., setting up cost/profit center structures, organizational trees, purchase approval rules, etc.).
- The software is designed to handle various configurations and behaves predictably in any allowed configuration.
- The effect of configuration changes on system behavior and performance is predictable and is the responsibility of the ERP vendor. The effect of customization is less predictable. It is the customer's responsibility, and increases testing requirements.
- Configuration changes survive upgrades to new software versions. Some customizations (e.g., code that uses pre–defined "hooks" that are called before/after displaying data screens) survive upgrades, though they require retesting. Other customizations (e.g., those involving changes to fundamental data structures) are overwritten during upgrades and must be re-implemented.

Advantages of customization include:

- Improving user acceptance
- Potential to obtain competitive advantage vis-à-vis companies using only standard features.

Customization's disadvantages include that it may:

- Increase time and resources required to implement and maintain
- Hinder seamless interfacing/integration between suppliers and customers due to the differences between systems
- Limit the company's ability to upgrade the ERP software in the future
- Create overreliance on customization, undermining the principles of ERP as a standardizing software platform

=== Data migration ===
Data migration is the process of moving, copying, and restructuring data from an existing system to an enterprise resource planning (ERP) system. It is a critical component of a successful implementation and requires thorough planning. However, because migration typically occurs near the end of the implementation process, it often receives inadequate attention. The following steps can help structure an effective migration plan:

- Identify the data to be migrated.
- Determine the migration timing.
- Generate data migration templates for key data components
- Freeze the toolset.
- Decide on the migration-related setup of key business accounts.
- Define data archiving policies and procedures.

Often, data migration is incomplete because some of the data in the existing system is either incompatible or not needed in the new system. As such, the existing system may need to be kept as an archived database to refer back to once the new ERP system is in place.

=== Extensions ===
ERP systems can be extended with third-party software, often via vendor-supplied interfaces. Extensions offer features such as:

- product data management
- product life cycle management
- customer relations management
- data mining
- e-procurement
- accounting management

== Pros and Cons ==
=== Advantages ===
The most fundamental advantage of ERP is that the integration of a myriad of business processes saves time and expense. Management can make decisions faster and with fewer errors. Data becomes visible across the organization. Tasks that benefit from this integration include:

- Sales forecasting, which allows inventory optimization.
- Chronological history of every transaction through relevant data compilation in every area of operation.
- Order tracking, from acceptance through fulfillment
- Revenue tracking, from invoice through cash receipt
- Matching purchase orders (what was ordered), inventory receipts (what arrived), and costing (what the vendor invoiced)

ERP systems centralize business data, which:

- Eliminates the need to synchronize changes between multiple systems—consolidation of finance, marketing, sales, human resource, and manufacturing applications
- Brings legitimacy and transparency to each bit of statistical data
- Facilitates standard product naming/coding
- Provides a comprehensive enterprise view (no "islands of information"), making real–time information available to management anywhere, anytime to make proper decisions
- Protects sensitive data by consolidating multiple security systems into a single structure

=== Benefits ===
- ERP creates a more agile company that adapts better to change. It also makes a company more flexible and less rigidly structured so organization components operate more cohesively, enhancing the business—internally and externally.
- ERP can improve data security in a closed environment. A common control system, such as the kind offered by ERP systems, allows organizations the ability to more easily ensure key company data is not compromised. This changes, however, with a more open environment, requiring further scrutiny of ERP security features and internal company policies regarding security.
- ERP provides increased opportunities for collaboration. Data takes many forms in the modern enterprise, including documents, files, forms, audio and video, and emails. Often, each data medium has its own mechanism for allowing collaboration. ERP provides a collaborative platform that lets employees spend more time collaborating on content rather than mastering the learning curve of communicating in various formats across distributed systems.
- ERP is enhanced decision-making capabilities. By consolidating data from various departments and functions into a single, unified platform, ERP systems provide decision-makers with real-time insights and comprehensive analytics. This enables more informed and data-driven decision-making processes across the organization, leading to improved strategic planning, resource allocation, and overall business performance. Moreover, ERP systems facilitate better forecasting and trend analysis, helping businesses anticipate market changes, identify opportunities, and mitigate risks more effectively.

=== Disadvantages ===
- Customization can be problematic. Compared to the best-of-breed approach, ERP can be seen as meeting an organization's lowest common denominator needs, forcing the organization to find workarounds to meet unique demands.
- Re-engineering business processes to fit the ERP system may damage competitiveness or divert focus from other critical activities.
- ERP can cost more than less integrated or less comprehensive solutions.
- High ERP switching costs can increase the ERP vendor's negotiating power, which can increase support, maintenance, and upgrade expenses.
- Overcoming resistance to sharing sensitive information between departments can divert management attention.
- Integration of truly independent businesses can create unnecessary dependencies.
- Extensive training requirements take resources from daily operations.
- Harmonization of ERP systems can be a mammoth task (especially for big companies) and requires a lot of time, planning, and money.

== Adoption rates ==
Research published in 2011 based on a survey of 225 manufacturers, retailers and distributors found "high" rates of interest and adoption of ERP systems and that very few businesses were "completely untouched" by the concept of an ERP system. 27% of the companies survey had a fully operational system, 12% were at that time rolling out a system and 26% had an existing ERP system which they were extending or upgrading.

== See also ==
- List of ERP software packages
- Business process management
- Comparison of project management software

== Bibliography ==
- Alfaris, M. F.; Edikuncoro, G. Y.; Savitri, A. L.; Yogiari, D.; Sulistio, J. (2019). "A Literature Review of Sustain Enterprise Resource Planning". Materials Science and Engineering. 598 (1): 012128. Bibcode:2019MS&E..598a2128A. doi:10.1088/1757-899X/598/1/012128.
- Aronin, B. S.; Bailey, J. W.; Byun, J. S.; Davis, G. A.; Wolfe, C. L.; Frazier, T. P.; Bronson, P. F. (2018). "ERP Systems in the DoD". Global Combat Support System – Marine Corps: Root Cause Analysis. Institute for Defense Analyses. pp. 7–18. JSTOR resrep22788.5.
- Bahrami, Bahram; Jordan, Ernest (2013). Piazolo, Felix; Felderer, Michael (eds.). Utilizing Enterprise Resource Planning in Decision-Making Processes. Berlin, Heidelberg: Springer Berlin Heidelberg. pp. 153–168. ISBN 978-3-642-37021-2.
- Chofreh, Abdoulmohammad Gholamzadeh; Goni, Feybi Ariani; Klemeš, Jiří Jaromír (2018). "Evaluation of a framework for sustainable Enterprise Resource Planning systems implementation". Journal of Cleaner Production. 190: 778–786. Bibcode:2018JCPro.190..778C. doi:10.1016/j.jclepro.2018.04.182. ISSN 0959-6526. S2CID 158751005.
- Chou, Shih-Wei; Chang, Yu-Chieh (2008). "The implementation factors that influence the ERP (enterprise resource planning) benefits". Decision Support Systems. 46 (1): 149–157. doi:10.1016/j.dss.2008.06.003.
- Denić, Nebojša; Petković, Dalibor; Spasić, Boban (2020). Hashmi, Saleem; Choudhury, Imtiaz Ahmed (eds.). Global Economy Increasing by Enterprise Resource Planning. Oxford: Elsevier. pp. 331–337. doi:10.1016/B978-0-12-803581-8.11590-5. ISBN 978-0-12-813196-1. S2CID 169934398.
- Ferratt, Thomas W.; Ahire, Sanjay; De, Prabuddha (2006). "Achieving Success in Large Projects: Implications from a Study of ERP Implementations". Interfaces. 36 (5). INFORMS: 458–469. JSTOR 20141427.
- Grant, David; Hall, Richard; Wailes, Nick; Wright, Christopher (March 2006). "The false promise of technological determinism: the case of enterprise resource planning systems". New Technology, Work and Employment. 21 (1): 2–15. doi:10.1111/j.1468-005X.2006.00159.x. S2CID 6532611.
- Hitt, Lorin M.; Wu, D.J.; Zhou, Xiaoge (23 December 2014). "Investment in Enterprise Resource Planning: Business Impact and Productivity Measures". Journal of Management Information Systems. 19: 71–98. doi:10.1080/07421222.2002.11045716. S2CID 18977742.
- Holland, C.P.; Light, B. (1999). "Global enterprise resource planning implementation". Proceedings of the 32nd Annual Hawaii International Conference on Systems Sciences. Vol. 16. Hawaii, USA: IEEE. pp. 30–36. doi:10.1109/HICSS.1999.772762. ISBN 0-7695-0001-3. S2CID 206700140.
- Jacobs, F. Robert; Weston Jr., F.C. 'Ted' (2007). "Enterprise resource planning (ERP)—A brief history". Journal of Operations Management. 25 (2). Elsevier: 357–363. doi:10.1016/j.jom.2006.11.005.
- Jaradat, Zaid; AL-Hawamleh, Ahmad; Altarawneh, Marwan; Al-Tahat, Saqer; Nazzal, Muhannad Akram (2025). "Effects of effective ERP system utilization on enterprise economic sustainability through product life cycle cost control". Journal of Business and Socio-economic Development. 5 (3). Emerald Publishing: 240–258. doi:10.1108/JBSED-10-2024-0103.
- Karimi, Jahangir; Somers, Toni M.; Bhattacherjee, Anol (2007). "The Impact of ERP Implementation on Business Process Outcomes: A Factor-Based Study". Journal of Management Information Systems. 24 (1): 101–134. JSTOR 40398884.
- Kayas, Oliver George; McLean, Rachel; Hines, Tony; Wright, Gillian H. (2008). "The panoptic gaze: Analysing the interaction between enterprise resource planning technology and organisational culture". International Journal of Information Management. 28 (6): 446–452. doi:10.1016/j.ijinfomgt.2008.08.005. ISSN 0268-4012.
- Kumar, Kuldeep; van Hillegersberg, Jos (April 2000). "Enterprise resource planning: introduction". Communications of the ACM. 43 (4): 22–26. doi:10.1145/332051.332063.
- Kurbel, Karl E. (23 August 2013). Enterprise Resource Planning and Supply Chain Management. Springer Berlin Heidelberg. p. 359. ISBN 978-3-64-231573-2.
- Langenwalter, Gary A. (17 July 2019). Enterprise Resources Planning and Beyond Integrating Your Entire Organization. Taylor & Francis. p. 424. ISBN 978-1-42-004906-0.
- Liedtka, Jeanne; King, Andrew; Bennett, Kevin (2013). "Rethinking Strategic Planning at SAP". Solving Problems with Design Thinking: Ten Stories of What Works. Columbia University Press. pp. 74–91. JSTOR 10.7312/lied16356.9.
- Loh, Tee Chiat; Ching, Lenny Koh Siau (September 2004). "Critical elements for a successful ERP implementation in SMEs". International Journal of Production Research. 42 (17): 3433–3455. doi:10.1080/00207540410001671679. S2CID 108834696.
- Meiryani, Fernando; Erick, Setiani Putri Hendratno; Kriswanto, Septi Wifasari (2021). "Enterprise Resource Planning Systems: The Business Backbone". 2021 The 5th International Conference on E-Commerce, E-Business and E-Government. New York, NY, USA: Association for Computing Machinery. pp. 43–48. doi:10.1145/3466029.3466049.
- Momoh, A.; Roy, R.; Shehab, E. (2010). "Challenges in enterprise resource planning implementation: state-of-the-art". Business Process Management Journal. 16 (4). Emerald Group Publishing Limited: 537–565. doi:10.1108/14637151011065919.
- Morris, Michael G.; Venkatesh, Viswanath (2010). "Job Characteristics and Job Satisfaction: Understanding the Role of Enterprise Resource Planning System Implementation". MIS Quarterly. 34 (1). University of Minnesota: 143–161. doi:10.2307/20721418.
- Odell, Laura A.; Farrar-Foley, Brendan T.; Kinkel, John R.; Moorthy, Rama S. (1 February 2012). "The Next Generation Enterprise Resource Planning Environment". Beyond Enterprise Resource Planning (ERP): The Next Generation Enterprise Resource Planning Environment. Institute for Defense Analyses. p. 124. JSTOR resrep26969.
- O'Leary, Daniel E. (31 July 2000). Enterprise Resource Planning Systems: Systems, Life Cycle, Electronic Commerce, and Risk. Cambridge University Press. p. 232. ISBN 978-0-52-179152-6.
- Ragowsky, Arik; Somers, Toni M. (2002). "Special Section: Enterprise Resource Planning". Journal of Management Information Systems. 19 (1). Taylor & Francis: 11–15. JSTOR 40398564.
- Ranganathan, C.; Brown, Carol V. (2006). "ERP Investments and the Market Value of Firms: Toward an Understanding of Influential ERP Project Variables". Information Systems Research. 17 (2). INFORMS: 145–161. JSTOR 23015772.
- Riposo, Jessie; Weichenberg, Guy; Duran, Chelsea Kaihoi; Fox, Bernard; Shelton, William; Thorsen, Andreas (2013). "Organizational Change Management". Improving Air Force Enterprise Resource Planning-Enabled Business Transformation. RAND Corporation. pp. 23–28. JSTOR 10.7249/j.ctt5hhvgh.13.
- Rodríguez, Rocío; Molina-Castillo, Francisco-Jose; Svensson, Göran (2020). "The mediating role of organizational complexity between enterprise resource planning and business model innovation". Industrial Marketing Management. 84: 328–341. doi:10.1016/j.indmarman.2019.09.007. ISSN 0019-8501. S2CID 204496134.
- Scheer, August-Wilhelm; Habermann, Frank (April 2000). "Enterprise resource planning: making ERP a success". Communications of the ACM. 43 (4): 57–61. doi:10.1145/332051.332073.
- Shanks, Graeme; Willcocks, Leslie P. (11 September 2003). Second-Wave Enterprise Resource Planning Systems. Cambridge University Press. p. 449. ISBN 978-0-521-81902-2.
- Tavana, Madjid; Hajipour, Vahid; Oveisi, Shahrzad (2020). "IoT-based enterprise resource planning: Challenges, open issues, applications, architecture, and future research directions". Internet of Things. 11: 100262. doi:10.1016/j.iot.2020.100262. ISSN 2542-6605. S2CID 222006095.
- Tian, Feng; Xu, Sean Xin (2015). "How Do Enterprise Resource Planning Systems Affect Firm Risk? Post-Implementation Impact". MIS Quarterly. 39 (1). University of Minnesota: 39–60. JSTOR 26628340.
- Umble, Elisabeth J.; Haft, Ronald R.; Umble, M. Michael (16 April 2003). "Enterprise resource planning: Implementation procedures and critical success factors". European Journal of Operational Research. 146 (2). Elsevier: 241–257. doi:10.1016/S0377-2217(02)00547-7.
- Waldner, Jean-Baptiste (1990). Les nouvelles perspectives de la production (in French). Paris: Dunod. ISBN 978-2-04-019820-6.
- Zerbino, P.; Aloini, D.; Dulmin, R.; Mininno, V. (2021). "Why enterprise resource planning initiatives do succeed in the long run: A case-based causal network". PLOS ONE. 16 (12): e0260798. Bibcode:2021PLoSO..1660798Z. doi:10.1371/journal.pone.0260798. PMC 8675769. PMID 34914739.
