= ODIN Technologies =

ODIN technologies, Inc.
- Company type: Private
- Industry: RFID
- Founded: 2002
- Headquarters: San Diego, California, Westford, MA, Dublin, IRL, Budapest, HUN, Toulouse, FRA
- Key people: Patrick j. Sweeney II (Founder) Polina Braunstein, CEO
- Products: Packaged RFID software and solutions for Aviation, Government, Financial services and Healthcare industries Consulting services and software
- Website: http://www.odinrfid.com

ODIN provides RFID (Radio-Frequency Identification) software for the Aerospace, Government, Healthcare, Financial Services and Social Media markets. ODIN's world headquarters is located in San Diego, CA. ODIN was acquired by Quake Global in December 2012 and continues to focus on healthcare and asset tracking.

== History ==
ODIN won a $14.6M contract from the United States Department of Defense Defense Logistics Agency (DLA).

== Acquisition activity ==
In December 2010 ODIN announced the acquisition of Reva Systems. Terms of the deal were not publicly disclosed. Reva raised around $35 million in venture funding from Charles River Ventures, Northbridge Partners and Cisco.

ODIN was purchased by Quake Global in 2012 for an undisclosed sum and continues to focus on healthcare and asset tracking.

== See also ==
- RFID
- Information Technology
- Symbol Technologies
- Intermec
- Omni-ID
