= Patrick J. Sweeney =

American adventurer and tech company entrepreneur

Patrick Sweeney
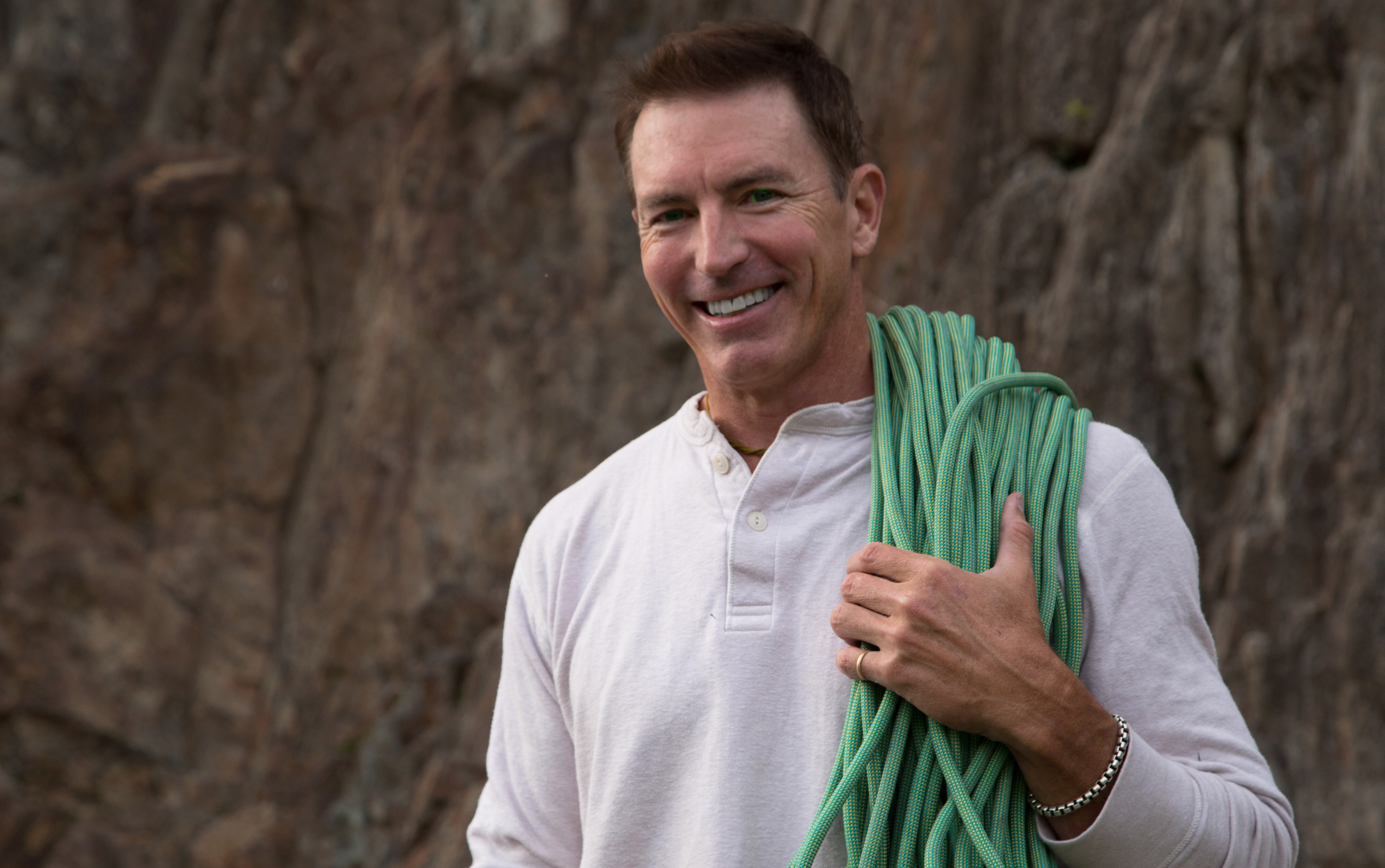
- Born: Patrick J. Sweeney II; November 9, 1966 (age 60); Boston, Massachusetts, United States
- Education: University of New Hampshire; University of Virginia
- Occupations: Author adventurer entrepreneur
- Years active: 1998–present
- Spouse: Christen Sweeney
- Website: www.pjsweeney.com

Patrick J. Sweeney, II (born November 9, 1970) is an American entrepreneur, adventurer, and author. He is the author of three books including a Wall Street Journal Bestseller, Fear is Fuel: The Surprising Power to Find Purpose, Passion and Performance, and RFID for Dummies.

Sweeney was the first person to attempt cycling the Seven Summits, and holds a world record for being the first person to officially cycle to Everest Base Camp and the first person to cycle Mount Elbrus.

== Early life and education ==
Patrick J. Sweeney II was born in November 9, 1970, in Boston to first-generation Irish immigrants. His father worked three jobs while his mother took care of the children. In 1982 they settled in Keene.

Sweeney enrolled in the University of New Hampshire where he took up rowing and was crew captain. He was the lead oarsman (stroke) on a four-man team that won the Dad Vail National Championship.

Sweeney also participated in the World Cup as a single sculler and two Olympic trials where he finished 14th in 1992 and 2nd in 1996 in the single scull (one man rowing). He retired in 1996 after winning the Royal Canadian Henley Regatta in the "Men's Elite Single" category.

In 1998, Sweeney earned an MBA from Darden Graduate School of Business Administration.

In 2002, Sweeney attended summer school at the Massachusetts Institute of Technology specifically at the auto-ID center for the Internet of Things (IoT), electronic Product Code and RFID.

== Career ==
Sweeney had his first job when he was in high school and started working part-time in Boston, Massachusetts. Upon graduating from the University of New Hampshire, he worked for four entrepreneurs in Bedford, New Hampshire, building houses, hotels, and restaurants, before leaving to train full time as an athlete.

Sweeney did an internship at Trammell Crow Company. In October 1999, he started a company, ServerVault, which provides ultra-secure web hosting facilities. The company was started with an initial investment of $750,000 from angel investors, including the Dave Matthews Band. In 2000, the company opened data centers in the United States and Ireland. In 2002, it was sold to Western & Southern Capital and later in 2009 to Carpathia Hosting.

In 2002, Sweeney and co-inventor of Electronic Product Code (EPC) protocol Daniel Engels started ODIN Technologies. It became dominant in RFID technology. In January 2013, the company was acquired by Quake Global. ODIN has completed over 500 RFID projects for clients including the US Department of Defense. At the 2009 RFID Journal Awards, ODIN won best-in-show for its patented Smart Container.

In 2010, Sweeney received one of seven Small Business Administration (SBA) Awards for Innovation, awarded by President Barack Obama.

In January 2013, Sweeney spun out a new company, named dwinQ, which is a live event social media company. Their first major project was the development of the Epic Mix system for Vail Resorts.

Sweeney launched a company in June 2022 which claims to build the world's most powerful bitcoin miner that can only be used on renewable energy. The specifications indicate a single miner produces 9 Petahash (one quadrillion hashes per second) of computing power. At the Mining Disrupt Conference in July 2022 held in Miami, FL he stated in a keynote speech his desire was to "put every miner using fossil fuels out of business."

== Writing ==
Sweeney has authored three books: RFID for Dummies (2005), CompTIA RFID+ Study Guide: Exam RF0-001 (2006), both published by John Wiley & Sons and Fear is Fuel: the Surprising Power to Find Purpose, Passion and Performance Performance published by Rowman & Littlefield.

Fear is Fuel: the Surprising Power to Find Purpose, Passion and Performance Performance later became a bestseller and was included in March 2020 The Wall Street Journal Bestseller List.

== Adventuring and athletics ==
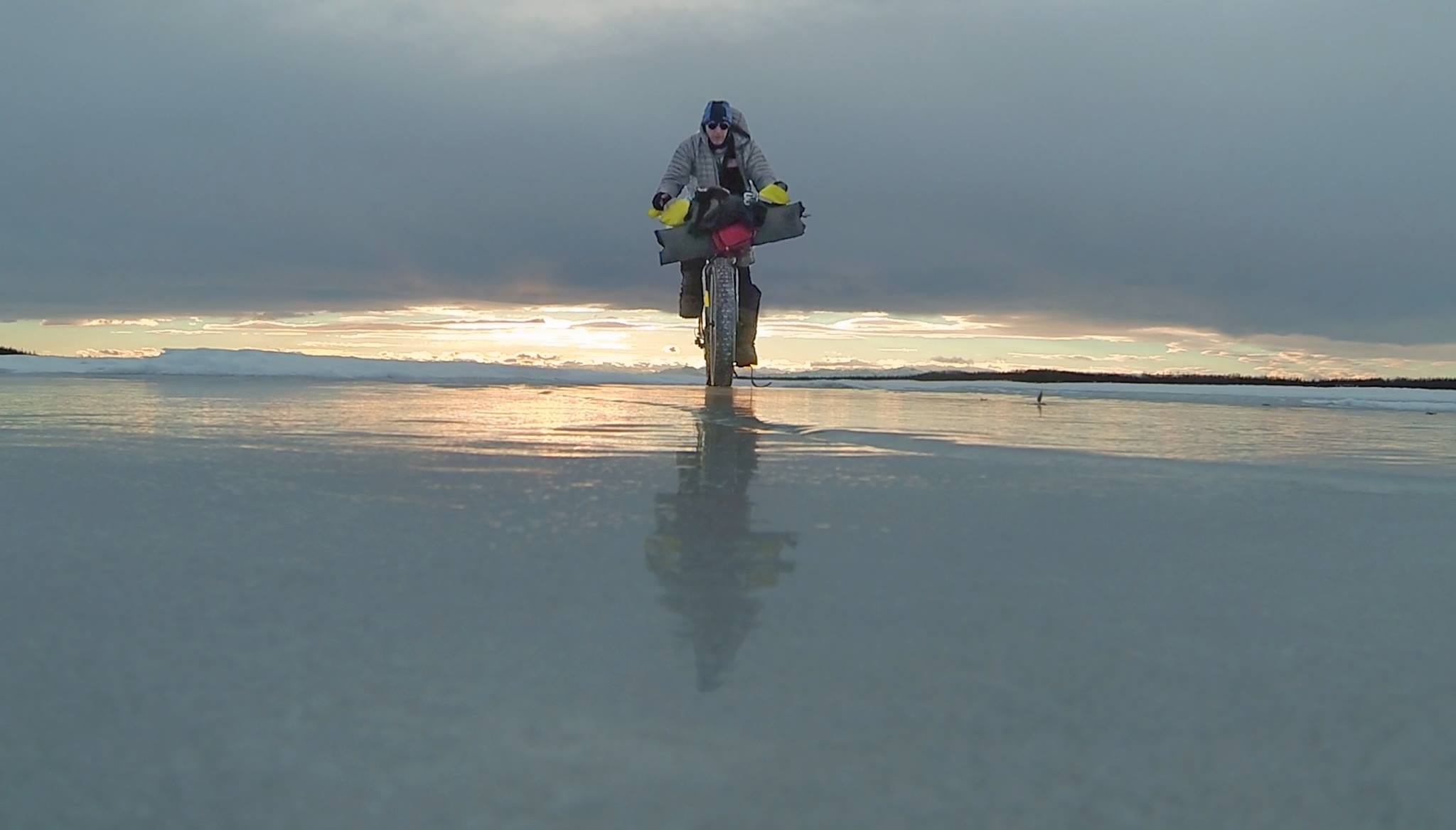
Patrick Sweeney during the 2013 Iditarod Trail Invitational on a Borealis Fatbike

In high school, Sweeney led Keene High School to the New Hampshire state championship in cross country skiing. In college, he was part of the ski team his first year but failed to make the team after the first year. He took up rowing at UNH and won a national championship.

In November 2012, Sweeney and four other American tech entrepreneurs formed CoreCo/dwinQ team to compete in a three-day La Ruta de los Conquistadores race.

In September 2013, Sweeney participated in Haute Route Pyrenees.

In February 2014, Sweeney participated in 350 miles in the Iditarod Trail Invitational race in Alaska on his fatbike.

In July 2014, Sweeney went on an adventure with his nine-year-old son who attempted to break the record for the youngest person to summit Mont Blanc. They contracted British mountain guide Kenton Cool to lead the crew. On their trek toward the summit they were caught in a sliding snow avalanche and decided not to continue. Sweeney filmed the attempt and the video was shown on Good Morning America, leading to criticism, including from Jean-Marc Peillex, mayor of the Saint-Gervais municipality in France for taking children on dangerous trips.

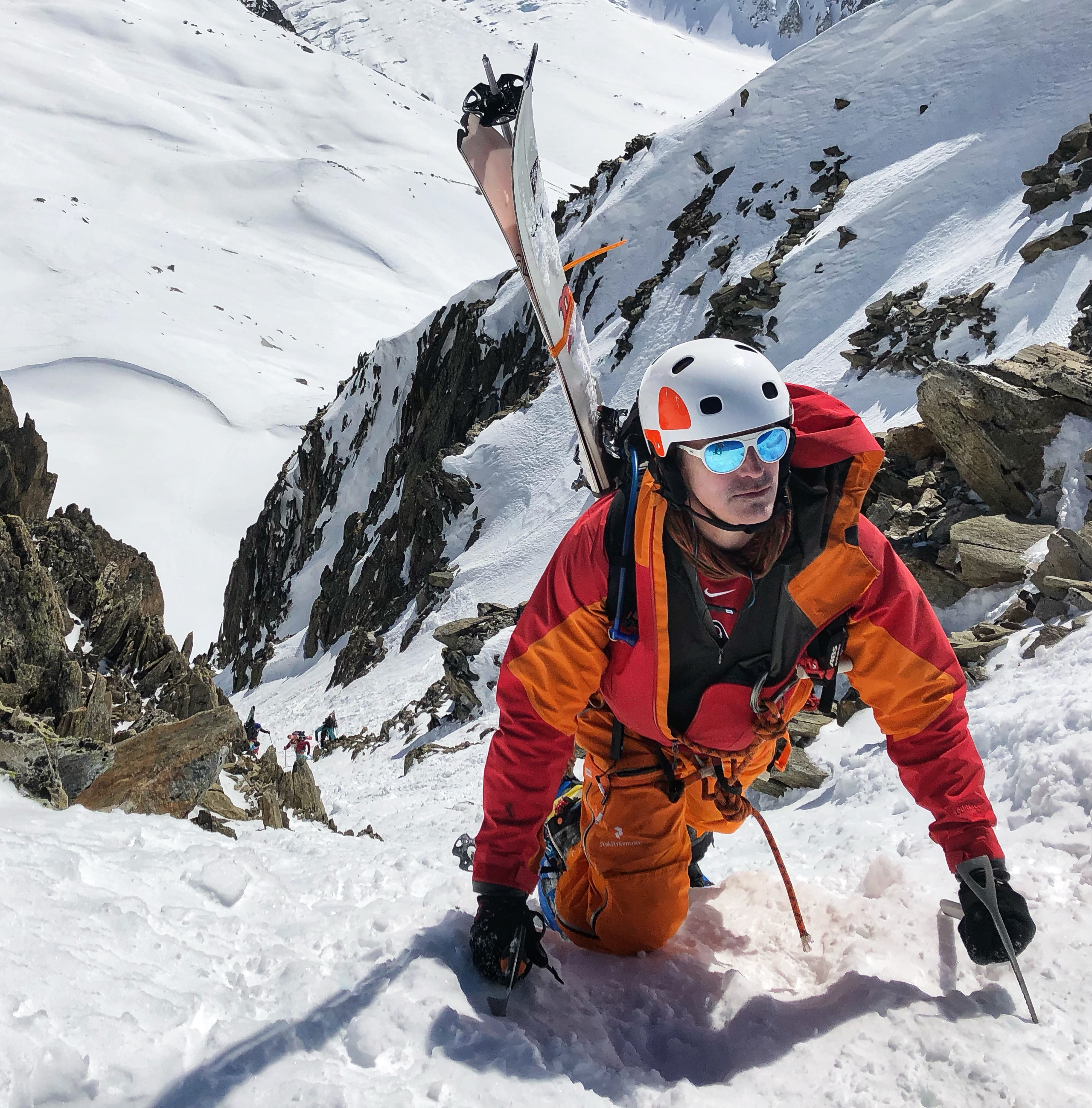
Patrick Sweeney ski mountaineering over the Col du Passon in Chamonix France in 2019.

In 2015, Sweeney started an attempt to become the first person to summit the highest mountain on each continent and then ride down. On February 24, 2015, after a 6-day ride starting from Lukla, he reached South Base Camp in Nepal by bike, setting a world record. The record was questioned by other mountain bikers, but Sweeney argues that he is the first mountain biker to reach base camp on the "more difficult" Nepali side with official permits and permission from the Nepalese government.

In 2016, Sweeney teamed up with endurance mountain biker and adventure racer, Rebecca Rusch, to summit Mount Kilimanjaro and raise funds and awareness for World Bicycle Relief. The journey started on February 21 and lasted for six days. Sweeney and Rusch started their ascent at 6000 feet, went to the top both by foot and on a bike and rode bikes down to the bottom.

During summer 2016, Sweeney climbed Mount Elbrus with his 11-year-old son. His son was not able to make it to the top, but Sweeney reached the summit becoming the first to bring a mountain bike to the top and descended to the base camp on a fatbike. The incident was the subject of a documentary film which was published by Outside Magazine and won the Moscow International Film Festival category for best story.

In 2018, Sweeney won the Race Across America (RAAM) in the Mixed 4-Person under 50 Category riding a bicycle non-stop from Oceanside, Californian to Annapolis, Maryland.

== Bibliography ==
- Sweeney, Patrick (2005). RFID for Dummies
- Sweeney, Patrick (2006). CompTIA RFID+Study Guide: Exam RF0-001
- Sweeney, Patrick (2020). Fear Is Fuel: The Surprising Power to Help You Find Purpose, Passion, and Performance
