= Utgard =

Utgard may refer to:

- Útgarðar, sites in Norse mythology associated with jötnar ("giants")
- Utgard (software), a vendor-independent Java OPC client API
- Utgard GPU: the microarchitecture of some variants of the Mali series of graphics processing units produced by ARM Holdings
- Utgard (album), by Enslaved, 2020
- Utgård, a village in Norway
