= Business management tools =

Agri business and value chain management pdf

Business management tools are all the systems, applications, controls, calculating solutions, methodologies, etc. used by organizations to be able to cope with changing markets, ensure a competitive position in them and improve business performance.

== Overview ==
There are tools related to each organization's department which can be classified for each aspect of management. For example: planning tools, process tools, records tools, employee related tools, decision making tools, control tools, etc. A classification by function would consider these general aspects:

- Tools used for data input and validation in any department.
- Tools used for controlling and improving business processes.
- Tools used for data consolidation and decision making.

Nowadays, management tools have evolved dramatically in the last decade thanks to fast technology advances, so fast that it is difficult to select the best business tools for any situation in any company. This is caused by a never-ending fight for lower costs and increase sales, the willingness for understanding the customers' needs, and the fight for delivering the products that meet their need in the way they require.

Under this scenario, managers should take a strategic attitude to business management tools instead of going for the latest tool. Usually, managers rely on the tools without any adaptation which leads to an unstable situation. Business management tools should be selected carefully, and then adapted to the organization needs and not the other way around.

== Most used ==
In 2013, a survey conducted by Bain & Company showed how business tools are used around the globe. These tools reflect how their outcomes contribute to each region's needs, considering the downfall and companies' market situation. The top ten includes:

- Strategic planning
- Customer relationship management
- Employee engagement surveys
- Benchmarking
- Balanced scorecard
- Core competency
- Outsourcing
- Change management programs
- Supply chain management
- Mission statement and vision statement
- Market segmentation
- Total quality management

== Software application for businesses ==
Software or collection of computer programs used by business users to carry out various business operations is referred to as business software (or a business application). These business applications are used to boost output, gauge output, and carry out various other company tasks precisely.

It started with management information systems and extended into enterprise resource planning systems. Then customer relationship management was added to the solution and finally the whole package moved into the cloud business management space.

Although there is an actual correlation between IT efforts and the organizations' performance, two elements are key to add value to the sum; these are the implementation's effectiveness and the proper tools selections and adaptation process.

== Tools for SMEs ==
The tools focused on SMEs are important because they provide ways to save money and make the entrepreneur's businesses more profitable. These tools have different functionalities such as project management, tracking finances, managing projects, sharing documents, connecting and networking with people, managing social media, and carrying out marketing, as well as everyday uses such as word processing or spreadsheets. Their main objective is to help entrepreneurs perform everyday duties in simple, low-cost ways. The downside to take in consideration is that some of the apps may be unreliable or will require organizations to advertise them.
