= Telenor Objects =

Telenor Objects AS is a Norwegian service provider within machine-to-machine communication, and constitutes one of the two Telenors strategic initiatives to catch the market for M2M, or connected objects. It is a wholly owned subsidiary of Telenor ASA, the incumbent telecommunications company in Norway. Telenor's M2M initiative is organized through Telenor Next - with Telenor Objects and Telenor Connexion serving customers in each part of the value chain, low and high in the valiue-chain, respectively. Telenor Objects grew out of Telenor R&I, and is headquartered in Oslo.

Telenor Objects delivers a managed service for connected objects. The aim is to enhance the extent and connectivity of network infrastructures that connect objects, and provide real-time information from such distributed devices, sensors or other assets. The company supports the internet of things concept - services that imply networked interconnection of everyday objects. The applications are especially applied to logistics, transportation (fleet management), fishery, agriculture, and to an increasing degree in healthcare.

Telenor Objects was formed in July 2009, by researchers and developers in Telenor Norway and Telenor R&I. The two entities had individually been working on piloting managed M2M services since 2007, with an RFID focus in Telenor Norway, and a focus on trace-and-track initiatives in Telenor R&I.

Together with Telefonica and Vodafone among European telecom companies, the Objects initiative brings Telenor to the Connected World 100 List 2010.

== Services and initiatives ==
Telenor Objects aims to provide a layered and horizontal architecture for connecting devices and applications. The company’s platform, dubbed Shepherd, provides a device library as well as a set of enablers to device and application providers. In addition, Shepherd includes a range of operational management services. Telenor Objects adheres to ETSI’s standardization initiative on connected objects.

Telenor Objects is a founding member of coosproject.org, a general-purpose, modular, pluggable and distributable open source middleware platform in Java; designed for connecting service and device objects that communicate via messages and enabling monitoring and management. The initiative is among several, newly established steps by Telenor into the open source and open innovation sphere.

== See also ==
- Telenor Connexion
- Machine-to-Machine
- COOS Project (connectivity initiative)
