= Telenor =

Norwegian telecommunications company

Coordinates: 59°53′59″N 10°37′46″E

Telenor ASA
- Type: Public; State-owned enterprise
- Traded as: OSE: TEL
- Industry: Telecommunications
- Founded: 1855; 171 years ago
- Headquarters: Fornebu, Norway
- Key people: Benedicte Schilbred Fasmer (President and CEO); Jon Omund Revhaug (Chairman of the Board)
- Products: Fixed line and mobile telephony; internet; digital television; IT services; IPTV; telegraphy
- Brands: Telenor; Talkmore
- Revenue: ▼80.5 billion kr (2023)
- Operating income: ▼21.5 billion kr (2021)
- Net income: ▼4.6 billion kr (2021)
- Total assets: ▼225.7 billion kr (2021)
- Total equity: ▼26.3 billion kr (2021)
- Owner: Government of Norway (54%)
- Number of employees: 11,000 (2023)
- Subsidiaries: See list
- Website: www.telenor.com

Telenor ASA (Norwegian pronunciation: [ˈtêːlənuːr] or [tɛləˈnuːr]) is a Norwegian majority state-owned multinational telecommunications company headquartered in Fornebu, Bærum, west of Oslo. It is one of the world's largest mobile telecommunications companies with operations worldwide, mainly focused in Scandinavia and Asia. It has extensive broadband and TV distribution operations in four Nordic countries and a 10-year-old research and business line for machine-to-machine technology. Telenor owns networks in eight countries.

Telenor is listed on the Oslo Stock Exchange and had a market capitalization in November 2015 of 225 billion kr, making it the third largest company listed on the Oslo Stock Exchange after DNB and Equinor (previously known as Statoil).

== History ==
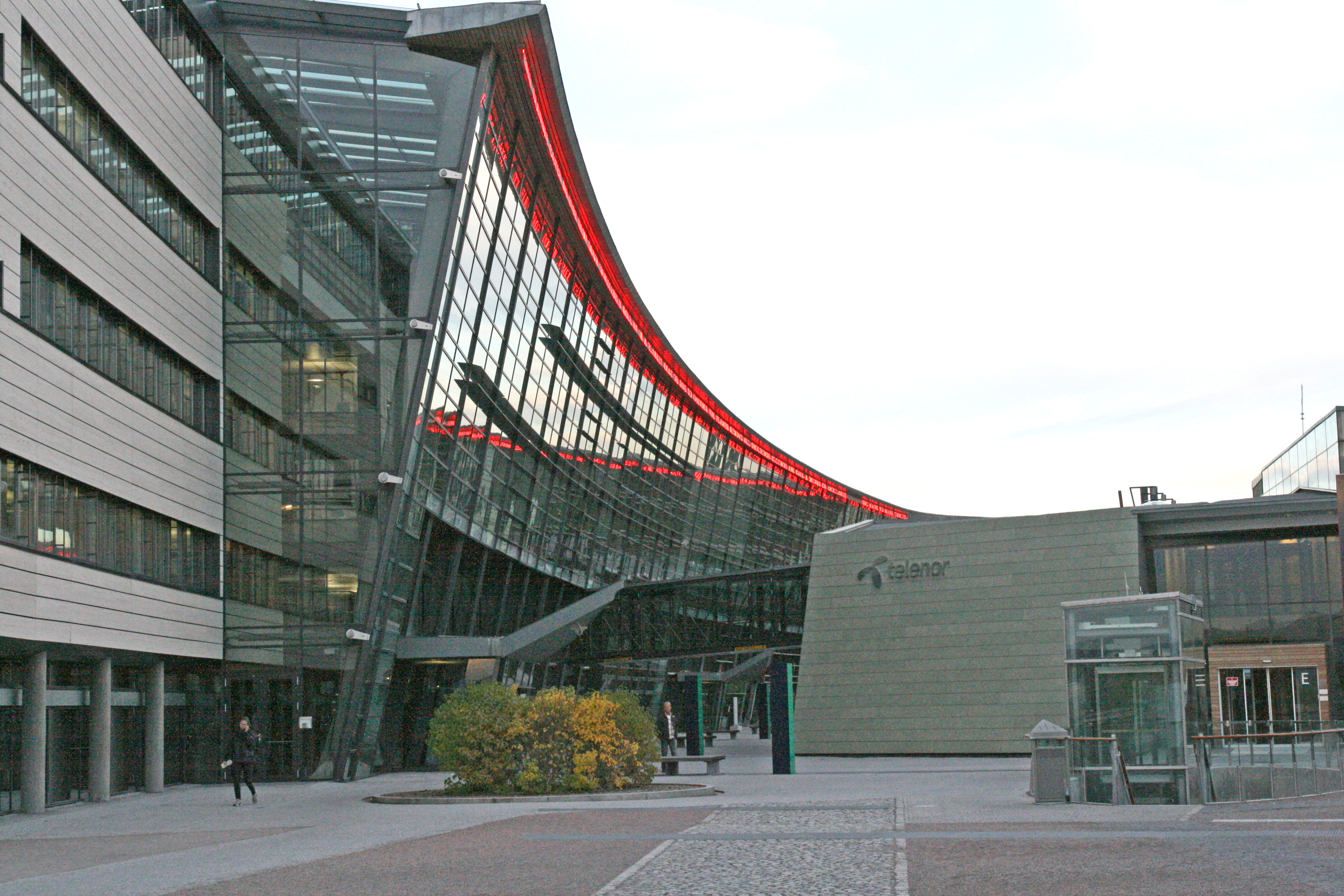
Telenor headquarters west building, containing Telenor Group.

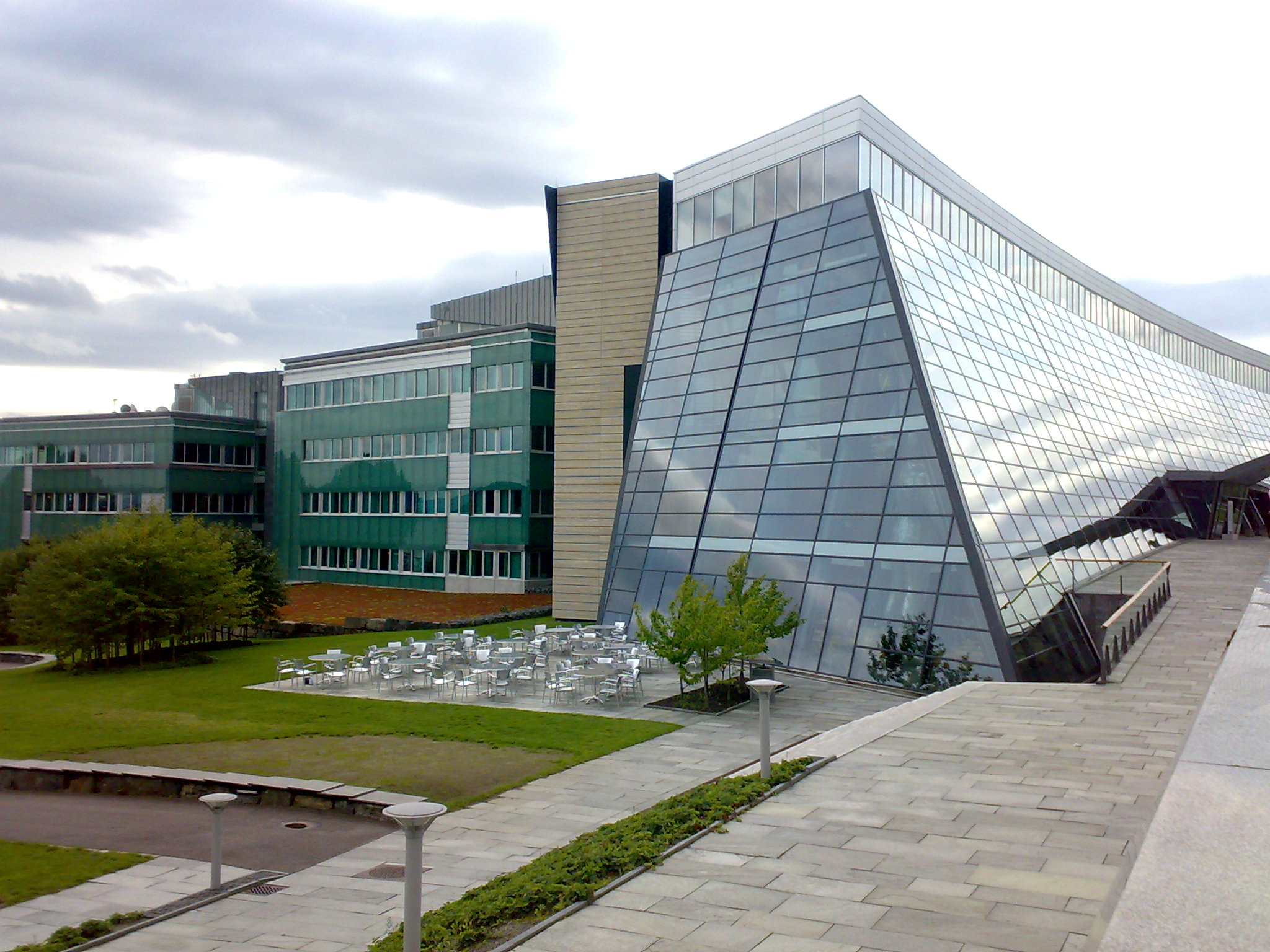
Telenor headquarters east building, containing Telenor Broadcast and Telenor Norway.

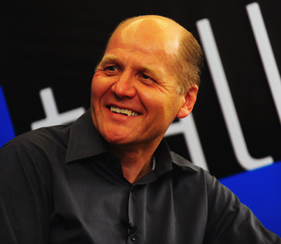
CEO Sigve Brekke, head of the Telenor Group (2015–2024)

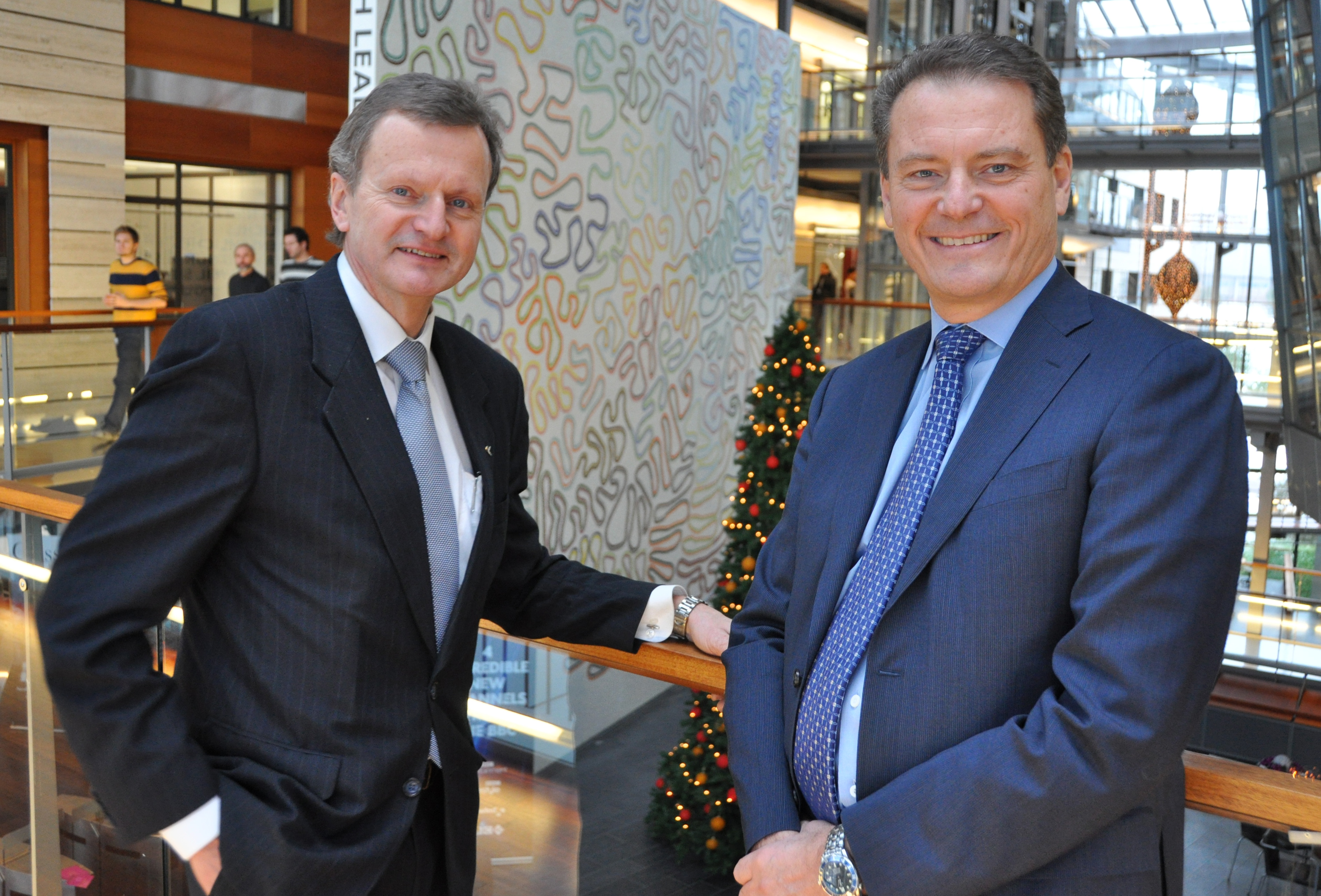
Former CEO Fredrik Baksaaas (left) with Ericsson CEO Carl-Henrik Svanberg, 2008.

Old style Telenor Mobile SIM, with the former company logo.

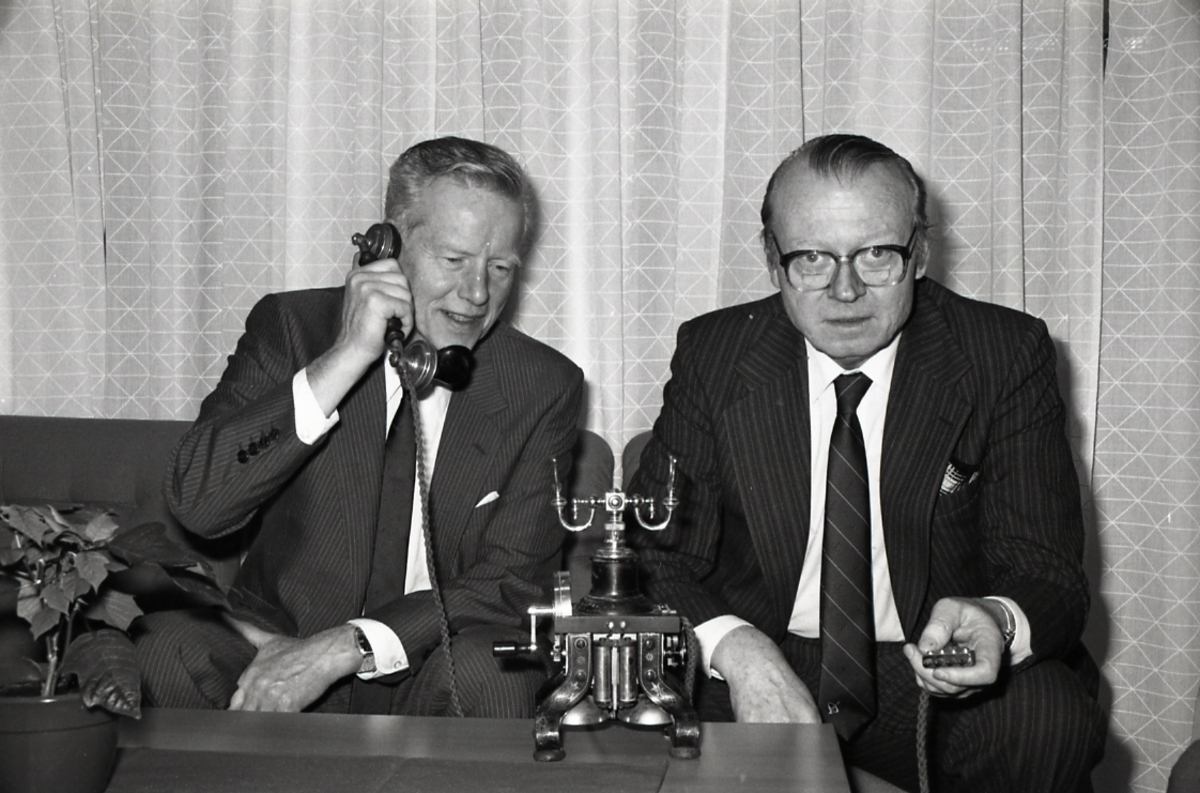
Kjell Holler (right) was a Norwegian industrialist who headed Televerket, after having served as Minister of Industry of Norway.

=== Telegraph ===
Telenor was established in 1855 as a state-operated monopoly provider of telegraph services and was named Telegrafverket. The initial planning for a telegraph service in Norway was launched within the Royal Norwegian Navy in 1848. By 1852, the plans were made public and the Parliament of Norway decided to plan for the construction of a telegraph system throughout the country. Televerket began by connecting Christiania (now Oslo) to Sweden (Norway was at that time in a union with Sweden) as well as Christiania and Drammen. By 1857, telegraph services had reached Bergen on the west coast via Sørlandet on the south coast, and by 1871, it had reached Kirkenes on the far north coast. Cable connections were connected to Denmark in 1867 and to Great Britain in 1869. The telegraph was important for merchant marines who could now use the electric telegraph to instantly communicate between different locations, and get an advantage from better logistics.

=== Telephone ===
Old logo

The first telephone service in Norway was established in 1878 between Arendal and Tvedestrand, while the first international telephone service between Christiania and Stockholm was offered in 1893. Automation of the telephone system was started in 1920 and completed in 1985. In 1946, the first Telex service was offered. In 1976, satellite telephone connections to the Norwegian merchant navy, at the time the largest in the world, and to the oil platforms in the North Sea were established. This was the start of Inmarsat Satellite Communication which was the foundation to digitalising the telephone network between 1980–1985.

Televerket opened its first manual mobile telephone system in 1966. This was replaced with the automatic NMT system in 1981 and upgraded to the enhanced NMT-900 service in 1986. Norway was the first country to get an automatic mobile telephone system. The digital GSM system was established in 1993. The 3G/UMTS system began full operation in 2004.

Telenor and Huawei conducted a successful test of 5G with 70 Gbit/s speeds in a lab environment.

The Opera web browser was created in 1994 by Jon Stephenson von Tetzchner and Geir Ivarsøy during their tenure at Telenor. Opera Software was established in 1995, where they went on to continue the development of their browser.

=== Deregulation and internationalisation ===
The corporation changed its name to Televerket in 1969. In 1994, the company, then known as Norwegian Telecom, was established as a public corporation. The telecom sector in Norway was deregulated in stages between 1994 and 1998. An attempt to merge Telenor with its counterpart in Sweden, Telia, failed in 1999 while both still were owned by their respective governments. On 4 December 2000, the company was partially privatised and listed on the Oslo Stock Exchange and NASDAQ. This privatisation gave the company 15.6 billion kr in new capital, with the Government of Norway owning 77.7 percent of the company. As of 2014, the Norwegian government holds 53.97 percent of the Telenor shares directly and another 4.66 percent through the Government Pension Fund Norway.

In the second half of the 1990s, Telenor began mobile operations in other countries: Russia (1994), Bangladesh, Greece, Ireland, Germany and Austria (1997), Ukraine (1998), Malaysia (1999), Denmark and Thailand (2000), Hungary (2002), Montenegro (2004), Pakistan (2004), Slovakia, the Czech Republic, Serbia (2006), Myanmar (2014). Operations in Greece, Ireland and Germany were sold between 1999-2000 and profits were re-invested into emerging markets. In October 2005, Telenor acquired Vodafone Sweden, changing its name to Telenor in April 2006.

Grameenphone was Telenor's first venture in the Asian telecom market and is now the largest mobile operator in Bangladesh. Telenor holds a 55.8 percent stake of the company. Grameenphone started trading its shares on the stock exchanges in Dhaka and Chittagong on 16 November 2009. The success of Grammeenphone lead to an increased focus on Asia, with successful entries into Malaysia, Thailand, Pakistan and Myanmar. Telenor also entered the Indian market, but had to withdraw in 2017 sustaining substantial losses.

In March 2018, Telenor sold its businesses in Southeast Europe (Bulgaria, Hungary, Montenegro and Serbia) to the PPF Group, totalling €2.8 billion in order to focus on the Nordic and Asian market.

In 2019, Telenor bought DNA, the third largest mobile operator in Finland.

On 21 June 2021, Axiata, Telenor and Digi agreed to a potential merger of Celcom and Digi to create a stronger telco in Malaysia, which was approved by both Celcom and Digi shareholders on 18 November 2022. This comes after advanced discussions two months earlier. The merged company became CelcomDigi. On completion, Axiata and Telenor held equal ownership of 33.1 percent each in the newly merged company. The merger was completed on 30 November 2022 and the company began its operations the next day.

On 22 November 2021, Telenor and Charoen Pokphand Group officially announced they have agreed to explore a US$8.6 billion merger plan between Thailand's second and third largest telecom operators by subscribers, True Corporation (TRUE) and Total Access Communication (DTAC). The proposed merger was subject to regulatory approvals. The merger was acknowledged by the regulator NBTC at a meeting on 20 October 2022. The newly merged company was founded on 1 March 2023, retaining the TRUE name and was listed on the Stock Exchange of Thailand under the ticker TRUE on 3 March 2023.

== Operations ==
Telenor offers a full range of telecommunication services in the Nordic countries, including mobile and fixed telephony, internet access and cable TV access and content. Telenor still remains the largest telco in Norway despite competition from Telia and others.

The group is prominent in the Scandinavian broadband and TV markets, both with regard to the number of subscribers and to the extent of coverage. The TV distribution arm is called Allente. Telenor has operations in three Asian countries.

Telenor has controlling interests in mobile operators in Norway, Denmark, Finland, Sweden and Bangladesh. It has minority interests in mobile operators in Malaysia and Thailand.

Country	Operator	Native name	Ownership stake	2019 revenue (million NOK)
Norway	Telenor Norway	Telenor	Full Ownership	28,658
Denmark	Telenor Denmark	Telenor	Full Ownership	4,871
Finland	DNA	DNA	Full Ownership	3,433
Sweden	Telenor Sverige	Telenor	Full Ownership	12,857
Bangladesh	Grameenphone	গ্রামীণফোন	55.8 percent	14,980
Malaysia	CelcomDigi	celcomdigi	33.1 percent	13,572
Thailand	True Corporation	ทรู คอร์ปอเรชั่น	5.35 percent (Note: Divested 24.95% in True Corporation on January 22, 2026. The remaining 5.35% put to a mutual put/call option two years after previous divestment for a total value of approximately 39 billion kr.)	22 994

=== Telenor Amp ===
In 2022, Telenor established Telenor Amp, a business area managing companies adjacent to its core telecommunications operations, including Telenor Connexion.. In August 2026, Telenor replaced its business-area structure, transferring the former Amp portfolio to its Corporate Development function.

=== Research ===
Telenor Research is Telenor's corporate unit for Research & Development. The unit conducts research and delivers research-based advice on topics such as market, technology, data analytics, innovation and organization. Telenor Research provides research-based analysis and strategic recommendations to the Telenor Group, as well as to the individual business units across Telenor's markets. Telenor Research's mission is to create business value for Telenor through applied research.

=== Internet of Things (IoT) and Machine-to-machine ===
Telenor started exploring the potential of M2M in 2000, when Telenor R&D established a project aimed toward technology, services and business models. This was further spurred when Telenor acquired the Swedish mobile company Europolitan, which contained parts of Vodafone's research in the area. As a result, two separate companies were established: Telenor Connexion in Stockholm, Sweden (aiming higher up in the M2M value chain) and Telenor Objects (aiming further down in the value chain). The initiative has resulted in a substantial market share of Europe's fast-growing M2M market and is being used by Nissan in Europe to connect its customers' electric cars. As of 2017, Telenor Objects is no longer active.

In 2021, Telenor unified its IoT operations under the brand Telenor IoT, combining Telenor Connexion with other units into a single global team of around 200 specialists. Analysts have included Telenor in Gartner's Magic Quadrant for Managed IoT Connectivity Services and Transforma Insights' CSP IoT Peer Benchmarking 2024. In 2025, trade publications reported that Telenor IoT had surpassed deploying 25 million SIMs and through a partnership with Verizon Business enabled customers to access local U.S. networks via eSIM. In May 2026, Telenor announced an agreement with investment firm Verdane to establish joint ownership of Telenor Connexion. The transaction was completed in September 2026, with Telenor and Verdane each holding a 50% stake.

=== Broadcast ===
Telenor operates the national terrestrial broadcast network in Norway through its subsidiary Norkring.

Telenor owns half of Allente, the result of a merger between Telenor's subsidiary Canal Digital and Viasat which was completed on 13 April 2021.

Canal Digital was previously a leading TV content distributor in the Nordic region with about 2.7 million customers in 2011.

== Former operations ==
Telenor has sold a number of divisions after its privatisation, including Bravida, the former installation division and Findexa, now part of Eniro that is responsible for telephone directories. The browser vendor Opera Software originated in Telenor's R&D department. Telenor formerly provided a range of services related to satellite communication, including voice, television and data before its Telenor Satellite Services division was purchased by Vizada in 2007.

Telenor Kystradio was responsible for the infrastructure of maritime radio communication in Norway which also included five staffed coast radio stations whose primary purpose is to monitor the maritime radio traffic (over e.g. VHF and MF bands) and to assist marine vessels in distress.. These tasks were returned to the state on 1 January 2026.

Telenor also owned the Thor family of satellites until selling them to Space Norway, part of the Norwegian Space Agency, in 2023.

Telenor was also active in international markets as a mobile phone network operator:

Country	Year of entry	Year of exit
Austria	1997	2007
Bulgaria	2013	2017
Czech Republic	1998	2005
Germany	1997	2020
Greece	1997	2019
Hungary	2002	2017
India	2009	2018
Ireland	1997	1999
Montenegro	2004 (previously Serbia and Montenegro)	2008
Myanmar	2014	2021
Pakistan	2004	2025
Russia	1994	2022
Serbia	2006	2017
Slovakia	1998	2005
Ukraine	1998	2019

== Controversy ==
On 28 August 2025, it was announced that anti-coup activists in Justice for Myanmar accused Telenor of providing surveillance equipment and customer data to the Tatmadaw regime in a complaint to the Norwegian Police filed jointly with ICJ Norway. Telenor's data was also allegedly used by the Tatmadaw to track down 88 Generation Students member, Ko Jimmy on 13 February 2021.

The prime minister of Norway and two cabinet members have been questioned in writing by the Parliament's Standing Committee on Scrutiny and Constitutional Affairs and have been asked to answer by 6 November 2025. Furthermore, on 23 October 2025, the media stated the Nobel Prize winner Aung San Suu Kyi was one of the victims of the data violations.

== See also ==
- AeroMobile
- COMSAT mobile communications
- List of mobile network operators
- Opera Software ASA
