= RacoWireless =

American telecommunications technology company

- Company type: Private
- Industry: Machine to Machine
- Founded: 2006
- Defunct: 2014
- Headquarters: Cincinnati, United States
- Area served: North America, South America, Europe
- Number of employees: 120
- Website: www.racowireless.com

RacoWireless was a provider of wireless products and services focusing on the machine to machine (M2M) industry. The company delivered wireless data and provided a platform for companies to build and support wireless M2M applications.

In November 2014, RacoWireless was acquired by a private equity backed, competing M2M MVNO KORE Wireless Group.

== History ==
RacoWireless was initially formed as a subsidiary of RACO Industries LLC in Cincinnati, Ohio. The parent organization RACO Industries was founded in 1988 by current CEO Rob Adams as a value-added reseller of barcoding hardware and data-collection services. The company also partnered with network carriers to provide vehicle-tracking solutions.

In 2005, the company shifted its focus towards data aggregation and began building a data aggregation platform. The following year, the company was approached by T-Mobile with the concept of becoming a data aggregator in the M2M space, and RacoWireless was officially founded in 2006.

RacoWireless developed its Omega Management Suite as a web-based platform to provide customers with an M2M device management and monitoring system. The company worked with T-Mobile and their M2M solutions team, which was led by national director of M2M John Horn. In 2011, RacoWireless announced that Horn had left T-Mobile to become President of RacoWireless. As part of the move, RacoWireless signed a deal to become T-Mobile's preferred partner for new M2M business and operational support.

In 2011, RacoWireless and T-Mobile partnered with Audi to offer Audi Connect – an in-car service that allows users access to news, weather, and fuel prices while turning the vehicle into a secure mobile Wi-Fi hotspot allowing passengers access to the Internet.

RacoWireless formed partnerships with other international mobile network carriers including EE in the UK, Rogers in Canada, Sprint, and Telefonica out of Spain and Latin America.

In October 2012, Inverness Graham Investments, a private equity firm out of Philadelphia, announced a controlled recapitalization of RacoWireless. In July 2013, RacoWireless announced the acquisition of Position Logic, a provider of B2B GPS Tracking services with operations in North America, South America, Europe, Africa and the Middle East.

In November 2014, RacoWireless was acquired by a private equity backed, competing M2M MVNO KORE Wireless Group.

== Company ==
RacoWireless provided products and services for the machine-to-machine (M2M) world. It offered the Omega Management Suite, an information tool providing web-based M2M management, reporting, and alerting features; SIM activation, maintenance, and management; web-based billing solutions; consulting, carrier device certification, application hosting, and virtual LAN solutions.

RacoWireless serviced fleet management, asset tracking, healthcare, monitoring and control, and point-of-sale transaction processing. The Company has operations in 60 countries and employs 100 people in the US and Latin America.

== New technology ==
Working in partnership with T-Mobile, RacoWireless was the first M2M provider to launch embedded SIM. This technology allowed GSM solutions to enter more restrictive verticals where temperature and vibration had previously kept earlier technologies out.

RacoWireless, partnered with EE and Giesecke & Devrient, introduced the first Multi-IMSI SIM to the market. Multi-IMSI technology allows a single SIM card to be assigned to multiple subscriptions and carriers.
