= Timothy Donahue =

- Born: 1949 (age 76–77)
- Education: John Carroll University
- Occupations: CEO, Telecom Acquisition Corp

Timothy Donahue is the current CEO and member of the Board of Directors of Cerberus Telecom Acquisition Corp. (CTAC). Cerberus Capital Management tapped Mr. Donahue to lead CTAC because of his deep industry expertise, which includes serving as Executive Chairman of Sprint Nextel, President and Chief Executive Officer of Nextel Communications Inc., as well as holding senior executive roles at AT&T Wireless. He is considered to be one of the wireless industry's pioneers, having started his career working at McCaw Cellular.

Under his leadership, CTAC selected IoT global leader KORE as a merger target. The fully diluted pro-forma implied enterprise value of the combined company is approximately $1.014 billion, and the transaction is expected to close in Q3 2021.

== Career ==
He began his career leading the pager division of McCaw Cellular and then served as northeast regional president for AT&T Wireless Services operations from 1991 to 1996.

In January 1996, the Nextel Board of Directors tapped Mr. Donahue as President and Chief Operating Officer. From 1999 to 2005, Mr. Donahue served as president and CEO of Nextel Communications. He then served as the Executive Chairman of Sprint Nextel Corp from August 2005 to December 2006. On October 10, 2006, Mr. Donahue announced his retirement as Chairman of Sprint Nextel effective the end of the year.

Nextel experienced record setting financial results under Mr. Donahue's leadership, with nine straight quarters of positive net income. During his tenure as President and CEO of Nextel, he helped build Nextel into a Fortune 200 company; increasing the subscriber base to 16.2 million in 2004 and significantly reducing debt. In 2003 he earned $26.3 million in pay from Nextel and by June 2004 he held 1.8 million Nextel shares.

He currently serves on the Board of Directors for Aura Network Systems (Cerberus is an Aura investor), Ligado Networks, Radius Networks, and UCT Coatings.

He has served on the Board of Directors for Kodak, Tyco, NVR, Covidien, and ADT.He is currently Chairman of the Board for KORE Group Holdings (NYSE-KORE).

== Personal ==
Mr. Donahue is one of twelve children.

He graduated from John Carroll University in 1971. In 2015, Mr. Donahue and his wife, Jayne, committed $6 million to John Carroll University to provide scholarships. He also served on the Board of Directors for the University.
