= Industrial Marketing Management =

Academic peer-reviewed journal in the field of industrial marketing

- Discipline: Marketing
- Language: English
- Edited by: Adam Lindgreen, Anthony Di Benedetto

Publication details
- History: 1971–present
- Publisher: Elsevier
- Frequency: 8/year
- Open access: Hybrid
- Impact factor: 10.3 (2022)

Standard abbreviations
- ISO 4: Ind. Mark. Manag.

Indexing
- ISSN: 0019-8501 (print); 1873-2062 (web)
- LCCN: 72621644
- OCLC no.: 1367286963

Links
- Journal homepage; Online archive

Industrial Marketing Management is a peer-reviewed academic journal covering the field of marketing, business-to-business, and industrial marketing. It is published by Elsevier and the editors-in-chief are Adam Lindgreen (Copenhagen Business School) and Anthony Di Benedetto (Temple University). The journal was established in 1971 with R. Derek Medford founding editor-in-chief. The journal was associated with research from the Industrial Marketing and Purchasing Group, a European research initiative in the field of industrial marketing. From 1994 to 2016 Peter LaPlaca served as editor-in-chief.

== Abstracting and indexing ==
The journal is abstracted and indexed in Scopus and the Social Sciences Citation Index. According to the Journal Citation Reports, its 2022 impact factor is 10.3.
