= KORE Wireless =

American telecommunications company

KORE Wireless Group
- KORE Group Holdings logo
- Type: Private company
- Industry: Telecommunications
- Founded: May 1, 2003
- Founder: Chris Scatliff
- Headquarters: Atlanta, Georgia, United States
- Key people: Timothy Donahue (Chairman); Ron Totton (President and CEO); Anthony Bellomo (CFO); Jared Deith (CRO)
- Products: ConnectivityPro; KORE One Platform; SecurityPro; KORE eSIM (OmniSIM and SuperSim); Local Carrier SIMs
- Services: IoT connectivity; device certification; device testing; deployment services; managed services
- Divisions: KORE Connected Health; KORE Fleet; KORE Industrial; KORE Assets; Business Mobility Partners; SIMON IoT

KORE Wireless is a privately-owned company that provides IoT connectivity, managed services, and related solutions. The company supports applications across sectors including healthcare, logistics, fleet, utilities, and industrial automation, with more than 20 million active connections reported worldwide.

KORE operates as a global mobile virtual network operator (MVNO), offering multi-carrier connectivity in over 200 countries and territories. Its portfolio includes eSIM technologies, a connectivity management platform, and services for IoT deployment and operations.

KORE became a public company in 2021 through a merger with Cerberus Telecom Acquisition Corp. As of July 2026, they have recently undergone changes to take it private, once again. The company is headquartered in Atlanta, Georgia.

== History ==
KORE was founded in 2003.

Early in its history, KORE established connectivity partnerships with Rogers in Canada and AT&T in the U.S., providing LTE-M and other IoT services across both markets.

Wireless Matrix Corp selected KORE to provide the platform for fleet management across North America.

In 2010, Geotab selected KORE to enable it to expand its European telematics and fleet management products. KORE signed an agreement with both Vodafone and Iridium Communications to expand its MVNO M2M service to more than 180 countries in March 2011.

After launching the M2M consulting company KORE Systems, the company acquired all assets of nPhase from Verizon Wireless.

In May 2013, KORE became a founding member of the International M2M Council, with KORE's then COO Alex Brisbourne joining the council's board of governors. In November 2013, Inmarsat appointed KORE as its M2M distribution partner.

In March 2014, KORE acquired Jazz Wireless Data.

In November 2014, KORE announced that ABRY Partners would invest in the company and that KORE would acquire RacoWireless.

In April 2016, KORE acquired Wyless Group.

In December 2018, KORE announced its acquisition of Aspider.

In December 2019, KORE announced its acquisition of Integron, an IoT solutions and managed services provider.

In October 2021, KORE became a public company on the New York Stock Exchange after a merger with Cerberus Telecom Acquisition Corp., trading under the ticker symbol KORE.

In February 2022, KORE acquired Business Mobility Partners and SIMON IoT.

In June 2023, KORE acquired the IoT business unit from Twilio.

== Awards and recognition ==
- 2021: Named a "Leader" in the Gartner Magic Quadrant for Managed IoT Connectivity Services.
- 2021: "M2M Innovative Solution of the Year" for its eSIM Device Validation Tool, from IoT Breakthrough Awards.
- 2020: "Security Technology Award Winner" for its SecurityPro product, from the Fierce Innovation Awards.
- 2008: Included in the Red Herring 100 North America list.
- 2007: Named one of the "Top Nine Wireless Companies to Watch" by Network World.
