= Business Process Management Journal =

- Discipline: Quality management
- Language: English
- Edited by: Majed Al-Mashari

Publication details
- Former names: Business Process Re-engineering & Management Journal
- History: 1997–present
- Publisher: Emerald Group Publishing
- Frequency: Bimonthly
- Impact factor: 4.1 (2022)

Standard abbreviations
- ISO 4: Bus. Process Manag. J.

Indexing
- ISSN: 1463-7154
- LCCN: 98640962
- OCLC no.: 614005906

Links
- Journal homepage; Online archive

The Business Process Management Journal is a peer-reviewed academic journal that covers the field of quality management. The editor-in-chief is Majed Al-Mashari (King Saud University). The journal was established in 1995 as the Business Process Re-engineering & Management Journal and obtained its current title in 1997. It is published by Emerald Group Publishing. The journal is abstracted and indexed in DIALOG, Inspec, ProQuest databases, and Scopus.
