= Quake Global =

American analytics company

- Type: Private
- Industry: Technology, Telecommunications, Location Intelligence
- Founded: 1998; 28 years ago
- Headquarters: San Diego
- Key people: Polina Braunstein (President & CEO)
- Revenue: $26.2 million (2011)

Quake Global is a technology company that provides products for asset tracking, location, and analytics. Quake Global designs and implements facility or campus level asset tracking products typically based around RFID and/ or BLE technology. In 2012, Quake Global received an Inc. 5000 rank of 82 in the San Diego Metro Area. The company is based in San Diego.

== Company ==
Quake Global was founded in 1998. The company provides products and services in providing products and services for asset tracking, using RFID technology The company also designs and implements machine to machine (M2M) communication devices that are intended to utilize cellular networks or satellite networks to manage devices globally. They service organizations in various fields such as healthcare and law enforcement.

In 2010, Quake Global purchased transportation-tracking company, Stellar Satellite Communications, from Orbcomm. In 2012, Quake acquired Odin, a radio-frequency identification (RFID) company. The company used this acquisition to enter the healthcare sector and marked its introduction to the RFID market. The acquisition also gave Quake Global additional market share in RF M2M technology. Companies in more than 150 different countries utilize Quake's products and services, and the company holds seventeen patents.

In 2012, Quake Global partnered with SkyWave Global Communications to create QPRO. This technology was implemented in the Russian Federation's Inmarsat satellite network. QPRO is designed for fast transmission of data. Quake's other clients include Volvo, Komatsu, Caterpillar, Hitachi, Faria and Bell Equipment.

In 2019 Quake Global acquired Skynet Healthcare Technologies which enabled Quake Global to add BLE active technology to their passive RFID system already used in healthcare markets, as well as enter the senior living market.

Polina Braunstein is the president and CEO of Quake Global. She took the post in 2003. In 2009, Braunstein was a finalist for the Ernst & Young Entrepreneur of the Year Award. Born in Russia, she received a Master of Science in business and industrial engineering from Novocherkassk State Polytechnic University. Braunstein was nominated as a Top Influential Nominee in 2011.

== Awards and recognition ==
Quake Global reported revenue of $26.2 million in 2011 and has a three-year growth of 30%. In 2008 and 2009, it was listed on the Deloitte & Touche Technology Fast 500, which chronicles the fastest-growing private technology companies.
