= Eclipse NeoSCADA =

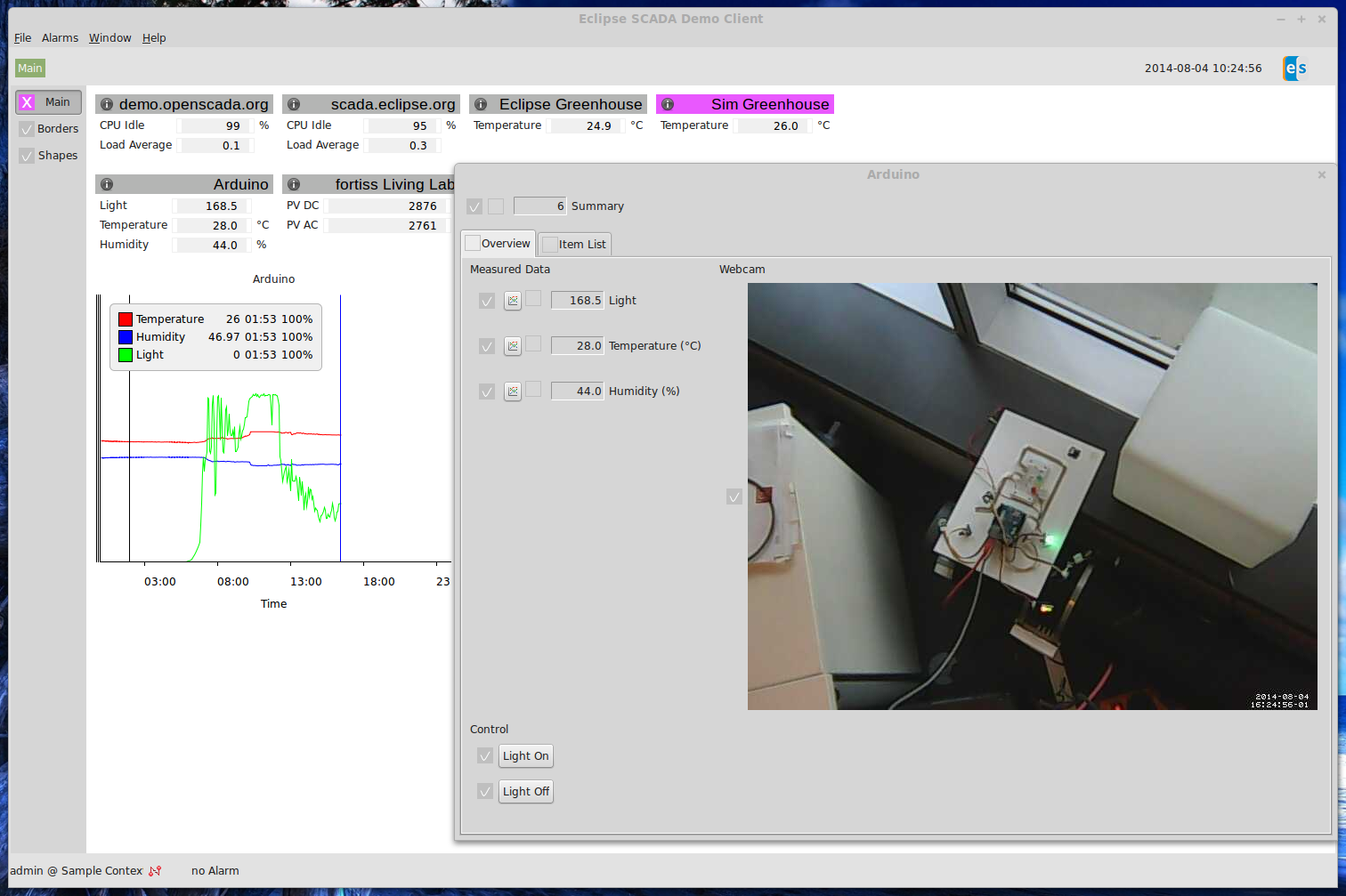
- Developer(s): Eclipse Foundation
- Stable release: 0.4.0 / February 15, 2017; 8 years ago
- Preview release: 0.5.0 / June 6, 2018; 6 years ago
- Written in: Java
- Operating system: Cross-platform
- Platform: Java platform
- Type: SCADA
- License: Eclipse Public License
- Website: eclipse.org/eclipsescada/

Eclipse NeoSCADA (formerly Eclipse SCADA) is an Eclipse Incubator project created in July 2013, that aims at providing a full state-of-the-art, open-source SCADA system that can be used out of the box or as a platform for creating a custom solution. Eclipse SCADA emerged from the openSCADA project, which now provides additional functionality on top of Eclipse SCADA.

The initial release (0.1.0) is based on the source code of openSCADA 1.2.0 and has been focusing on the relocation of the project to the Eclipse Foundation, like changing package names and namespaces.

The Eclipse NeoSCADA project is part of the Eclipse IoT Industry Working Group initiative.

As of August 28, 2014 Eclipse SCADA is filed under the Eclipse IoT top level project.

== Supported protocols ==
The following protocols are directly supported by Eclipse NeoSCADA:

- Command Line Applications
- JDBC
- Modbus TCP and RTU
- Simatic S7 PLC

Other protocols can be implemented by writing driver modules using the Eclipse SCADA API. There are a few driver modules currently available outside of Eclipse SCADA:

- OPC
- SNMP
