= Universal gateway =

A universal gateway is a device that transacts data between two or more data sources using communication protocols specific to each. Sometimes called a universal protocol gateway, this class of product is designed as a computer appliance, and is used to connect data from one automation system to another.

An early (or perhaps the earliest) invention of a device which specifically facilitates "universal" inter-device communication was 2010 within AT&T.

== See also ==
- Host adapter
- Protocol converter
