= Karabo =

Karabo is a given name in southern Africa and may refer to:

- Karabo Dhlamini (born 2001), South African soccer player
- Karabo Makhurubetshi (born 1999), South African soccer player
- Karabo Mathang-Tshabuse, South African soccer agent
- Karabo Meso (born 2007), South African cricketer
- Karabo Modise (born 1988), Motswana cricketer
- Karabo Motlhanka (born 1992), Motswana cricketer
- Karabo Mothibi (born 1996), Motswana athlete
- Karabo Poppy, South African artist
- Karabo, an Australopithecus sediba (hominid) fossil
- Karabo (SCADA framework), an open-source supervisory control and data acquisition (SCADA) framework; see European XFEL § Control
