= ASI Controls =

ASI Controls is a private United States company founded in 1986 in San Ramon, California. The company took its name from the core mission of providing application-specific intelligent controls for the newly emerging distributed digital control market. The founders were a small team led by William F. "Bill" Chapman and Don Evans.

== History ==
Bill Chapman was chair of the ASHRAE Technical Committee in the late 1970s and early 1980s. After seeing the potential for digital controls to improve both the comfort and energy management provided by building climate-control systems, Chapman sketched out a vision for future Distributed control system solutions in a 1980 ASHRAE Journal article (July, 1980). The article highlights a system with distributed microprocessor-based controllers sending and receiving data to and from a central computer, and the building engineer remotely monitoring and controlling any part of the system.

While at Staefa Control Systems, Bill Chapman led the development of the Smart One digital controller for VAV applications - one of the first digital VAV controllers available anywhere. Chapman left Staefa in late 1986 to start ASI Controls.

ASI Controls introduced the ASIC/1-8010 VAV controller at the AHR Expo in 1987 in New York, NY. Orders for the Gateway Plaza (Sydney, Australia), the Northwest Building (Minneapolis, Minnesota), and the Grand Hotel Esplanade (Berlin, Germany) were signed on the show floor.

Through the late 1980s and 1990s ASI Controls' products were applied in a variety of leading edge HVAC control and energy management applications around the world, including the Massachusetts Institute of Technology, Sanwa Bank Plaza building in Los Angeles, CA, the 191 Peachtree building in Atlanta, Georgia, the Dorchester Hotel and parts of the Canary Wharf complex in London, England, and many others.

ASI Controls introduced a more powerful class of controllers, the ASIC/2 configurable network and system controllers, in 1995. ASI Expert, one of the earliest graphical configuration software packages for DDC systems, was released in 1998.

Despite the early advantages, ASI Control's leading share in the market was eventually taken over by Johnson Controls, Honeywell, Siemens, and other established and newer competitors. ASI Controls today focuses primarily on Ethernet- and web-connected digital control systems, doing business through value added resellers and system integrators in North America, with major overseas markets in Asia, Mexico, and South America.
