= EPICS =

Software infrastructure for building distributed control systems

- Developer: Free software community
- Release: January 19, 1994
- Stable release: 7.0.10 / 10 February 2026; 4 months ago
- Written in: C/C++, Perl
- Operating system: Cross-platform
- Type: Open Source
- License: EPICS Open License
- Website: epics-controls.org
- Repository: github.com/epics-base/epics-base

The Experimental Physics and Industrial Control System (EPICS) is a set of software tools and applications used to develop and implement distributed control systems to operate devices such as particle accelerators, telescopes and other large scientific facilities. The tools are designed to help develop systems which often feature large numbers of networked computers delivering control and feedback. They also provide SCADA capabilities.

== History ==
EPICS was initially developed as the Ground Test Accelerator Controls System (GTACS) at Los Alamos National Laboratory (LANL) in 1988 by Bob Dalesio, Jeff Hill, et al. In 1989, Marty Kraimer from Argonne National Laboratory (ANL) came to work alongside the GTA controls team for 6 months, bringing his experience from his work on the Advanced Photon Source (APS) Control System to the project. The resulting software was renamed EPICS and was presented at the International Conference on Accelerator and Large Experimental Physics Control Systems (ICALEPCS) in 1991.

EPICS was originally available under a commercial license, with enhanced versions sold by Tate & Kinetic Systems. Licenses for collaborators were free, but required a legal agreement with LANL and APS. An EPICS community was established and development grew as more facilities joined in with the collaboration. In February 2004, EPICS became freely distributable after its release under the EPICS Open License.

It is now used and developed by over 50 large science institutions worldwide, as well as by several commercial companies.

== Architecture ==
EPICS uses client–server and publish–subscribe techniques to communicate between computers. Servers, the “input/output controllers” (IOCs), collect experiment and control data in real time, using the measurement instruments attached to them. This information is then provided to clients, using the high-bandwidth Channel Access (CA) or the recently added pvAccess networking protocols that are designed to suit real-time applications such as scientific experiments.

IOCs hold and interact with a database of "records", which represent either devices or aspects of the devices to be controlled. IOCs can be hosted by stock-standard servers or PCs or by VME, MicroTCA, and other standard embedded system processors. For "hard real-time" applications the RTEMS or VxWorks operating systems are normally used, whereas "soft real-time" applications typically run on Linux or Microsoft Windows.

Data held in the records are represented by unique identifiers known as Process Variables (PVs). These PVs are accessible over the network channels provided by the CA/pvAccess protocol.

Many record types are available for various types of input and output (e.g., analog or binary) and to provide functional behaviour such as calculations. It is also possible to create custom record types. Each record consists of a set of fields, which hold the record's static and dynamic data and specify behaviour when various functions are requested locally or remotely. Most record types are listed in the EPICS record reference manual.

Graphical user interface packages are available, allowing users to view and interact with PV data through typical display widgets such as dials and text boxes. Examples include EDM (Extensible Display Manager), MEDM (Motif/EDM), and CSS.

Any software that implements the CA/pvAccess protocol can read and write PV values. Extension packages are available to provide support for MATLAB, LabVIEW, Perl, Python, Tcl, ActiveX, etc. These can be used to write scripts to interact with EPICS-controlled equipment.

== Facilities using EPICS ==
List of institutions using EPICS, by region
| Region | Institute | Country |
|---|---|---|
| Africa | iThemba LABS | South Africa |
| Asia | KSTAR – Korea Superconducting Tokamak Advanced Research | Republic of Korea |
| Asia | J-PARC – Joint Facility for High Intensity Proton Accelerators | Japan |
| Asia | RIBF – RIKEN RI Beam Factory Project | Japan |
| Asia | KAGRA – Kamioka Gravitational Wave Detector | Japan |
| Asia | SuperKEKB at KEK in Tskuba | Japan |
| Asia | BSRF - Beijing Synchrotron Radiation Laboratory | China |
| Asia | VECC – Variable Energy Cyclotron Centre | India |
| Asia | TIFR- Tata Institute of Fundamental Research | India |
| Europe | Berliner Elektronenspeicherring für Synchrotronstrahlung (BESSY II) – Helmholtz-Zentrum Berlin | Germany |
| Europe | Deutsches Elektronen Synchrotron (DESY) | Germany |
| Europe | FHI free-electron laser (FEL) - Fritz Haber Institute of the Max Planck Society | Germany |
| Europe | GEO600 – Gravitational-wave observatory, Max Planck Institute for Gravitational Physics | Germany |
| Europe | GSI/FAIR | Germany |
| Europe | KArlsruhe Research Accelerator and FLUTE - Karlsruhe Institute of Technology | Germany |
| Europe | S-DALINAC – Technische Universität Darmstadt | Germany |
| Europe | Wendelstein 7-X – experimental stellarator, Max Planck Institute of Plasma Physics | |
| Europe | Diamond Light Source – Rutherford Appleton Laboratory | United Kingdom |
| Europe | ISIS Neutron Source - Rutherford Appleton Laboratory | United Kingdom |
| Europe | International Muon Ionization Cooling Experiment (MICE) – Rutherford Appleton Laboratory | United Kingdom |
| Europe | European Spallation Source ERIC (ESS) | Sweden |
| Europe | International Thermonuclear Experimental Reactor (ITER) | France |
| Europe | Spiral2 Système de Production d'Ions RadioActifs en Ligne de deuxième génération | France |
| Europe | Laboratori Nazionali di Legnaro | Italy |
| Europe | Swiss Light Source – Paul Scherrer Institut | Switzerland |
| Europe | SwissFEL – Paul Scherrer Institut | Switzerland |
| Turkish Accelerator and Radiation LAboratory (TARLA) | Turkey | |
| Middle East | Synchrotron-Light for Experimental Science and Applications in the Middle East (SESAME) | Jordan |
| North America | Advanced Light Source – Lawrence Berkeley National Laboratory | United States |
| North America | Advanced Photon Source – Argonne National Laboratory | United States |
| North America | Apache Point Observatory | United States |
| North America | FNAL – Fermi National Accelerator Laboratory | United States |
| North America | Facility for Rare Isotope Beams – Michigan State University | United States |
| North America | Gemini Observatory | United States |
| North America | W. M. Keck Observatory | United States |
| North America | Laser Interferometer Gravitational-Wave Observatory (LIGO) | United States |
| North America | Los Alamos Neutron Science Center – Los Alamos National Laboratory | United States |
| North America | National Spherical Torus Experiment – Princeton Plasma Physics Laboratory | United States |
| North America | National Spherical Torus Experiment Upgrade – Princeton Plasma Physics Laboratory | United States |
| North America | National Superconducting Cyclotron Laboratory – Michigan State University | United States |
| North America | National Synchrotron Light Source II – Brookhaven National Laboratory | United States |
| North America | Spallation Neutron Source – Oak Ridge National Laboratory | United States |
| North America | Stanford Synchrotron Radiation Laboratory – Stanford University | United States |
| North America | Linac Coherent Light Source – SLAC National Accelerator Laboratory | United States |
| North America | TJNAF – Thomas Jefferson National Accelerator Facility | United States |
| North America | Canadian Light Source – Saskatoon, Saskatchewan | Canada |
| North America | Canadian Neutron Beam Centre – Chalk River Laboratories | Canada |
| North America | TRIUMF – Located on the campus of the University of British Columbia | Canada |
| Not determined | IFMIF – International Fusion Materials Irradiation Facility | European Union Japan United States Russia |
| Oceania | Australian Synchrotron | Australia |
| Oceania | ANTARES – Australian Nuclear Science and Technology Organisation | Australia |
| Oceania | ASKAP (Australian Square Kilometre Array Pathfinder) – CSIRO | Australia |
| Oceania | Heavy Ion Accelerator at the Australian National University | Australia |
| South America | LNLS – Laboratório Nacional de Luz Síncrotron | Brazil |

== Commercial users ==
- BiRa Systems
- Ciemat
- CosyLab
- GLResearch
- idt
- Mobiis
- Nusano, Inc
- Observatory Sciences
- Osprey Distributed Control Systems
- Varian Medical Systems
- Pyramid Technical Consultants

== See also ==
- TANGO control system
- SCADA—Supervisory Control And Data Acquisition
- Karabo_(software)- Karabo Control System
