= Means of communication =

Methods used to exchange information

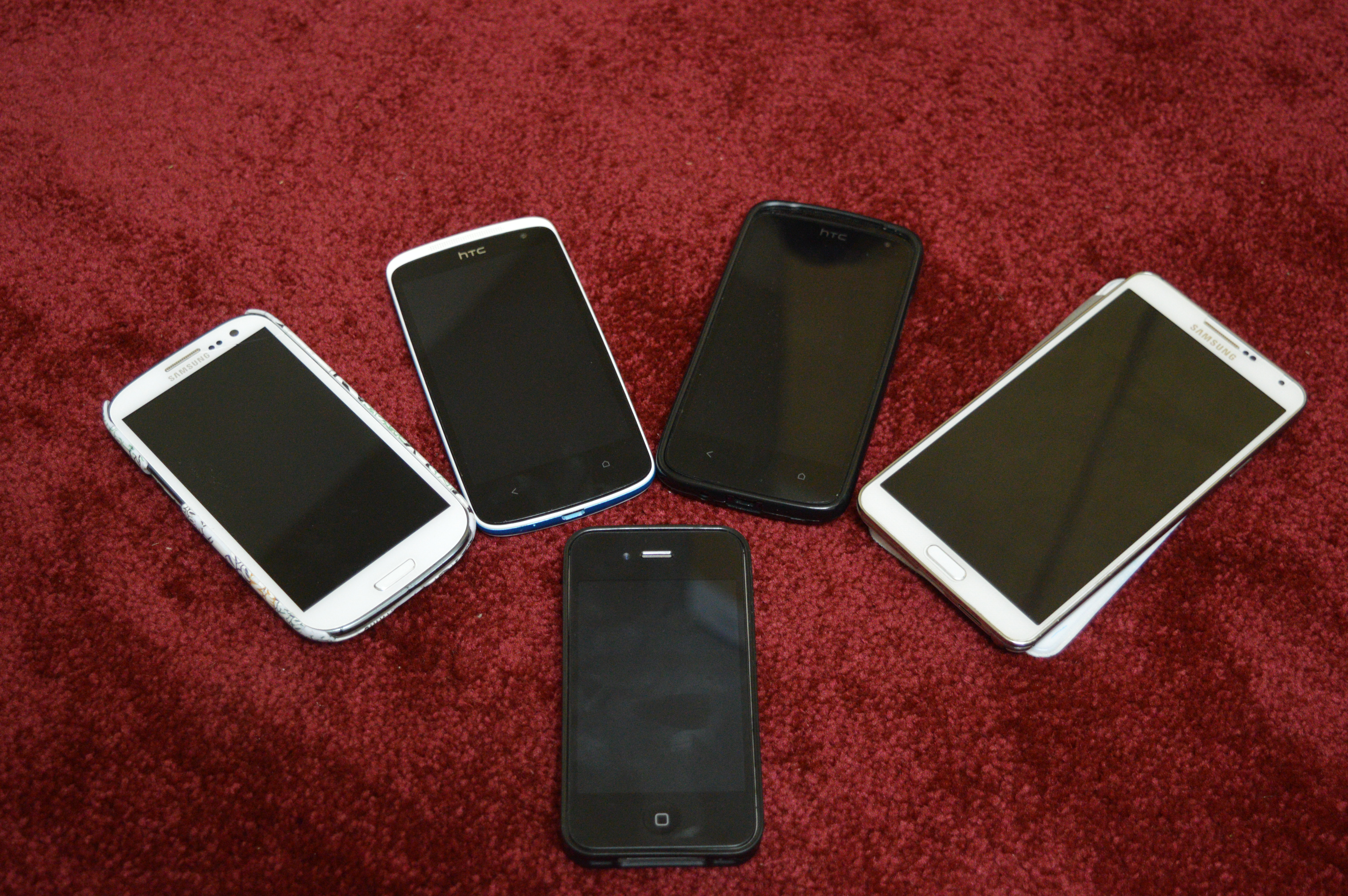
The smartphone – one of the most important means of communication of the 21st century

Means of communication or media are ways used by people to communicate and exchange information with each other as an information sender and a receiver. Diverse arrays of media that reach a large audience via mass communication are called mass media.

== General information ==
Many different materials are used in communication. Maps, for example, save tedious explanations on how to get to a destination. A means of communication is therefore a means to an end to make communication between people easier, more understandable and, above all, clearer. In everyday language, the term means of communication is often equated with the medium. However, the term "medium" is used in media studies to refer to a large number of concepts, some of which do not correspond to everyday usage.

Means of communication are used for communication between sender and recipient and thus for the transmission of information. Elements of communication include a communication-triggering event, sender and recipient, a means of communication, a path of communication and contents of communication. The path of communication is the path that a message travels between sender and recipient; in hierarchies the vertical line of communication is identical to command hierarchies. Paths of communication can be physical (e.g. the road as transportation route) or non-physical (e.g. networks like a computer network). Contents of communication can be for example photography, data, graphics, language, or texts.

Means of communication in the narrower sense refer to technical devices that transmit information. They are the manifestations of contents of communication that can be perceived through the senses and replace the communication that originally ran from person to person and make them reproducible.

== History of the term ==
Up until the 19th century the term "means of communication" was primarily applied to traffic and couriers and to means of transport and transportation routes, such as railways, roads and canals, but also used to include post riders and stagecoachs. In 1861, the national economist Albert Schäffle defined a means of communication as an aid to the circulation of goods and financial services, which included, among other things, newspapers, telegraphy, mail, courier services, remittance advice, invoices, and bills of lading.

In the period that followed, the "technical means of communication" increasingly came to the foreground, so that as early as 1895 the German newspaper "Deutsches Wochenblatt" reported that these technical means of communication had been improved to such an extent that "everyone all over the world has become our neighbor".

Not until the 20th century was the term medium also a synonym for these technical means of communication. In the 1920s the term mass media started to become more popular.

== Different types ==
A distinction can be made between oral, written, screen-oriented transfer of information and document transport:

verbal transfer of information	written transfer of information	screen-oriented transfer of information	Records transport
speech, mobile phones, telephones	letters, postcards, telex	Bildschirmtext, webcam	couriers
intercom	fax	online chat, email, presentation programs, SMS, MMS, teletext	conveyor belt message in a bottle
virtual assistant	teletex	remote data transmission	pneumatic tube
two-way radio, radiotelephones	computer terminals	satellite radio	carrier pigeon

In this table means of communication are mentioned that are no longer used today.

Furthermore, a distinction can be made between:

- natural communication:
  - nonverbal communications: applause, gestures, facial expressions (social means of communication); flag signs;
  - language: communication forms such as meetings, discussions;
- technical communication:
  - writing systems and drawings as data storage of language;
  - Email, fax, teletype, mobile phones, mass media, SMS/MMS, telephone, webcam.

Means of communication in the narrower sense are those of technical communication.

In companies (businesses, agencies, institutions) typical means of communication include documents, such as analyses, business cases, due diligence reviews, financial analyses, forms, business models, feasibility studies, scientific publications, and contracts.

Natural means of communication

The means of natural communication or the "primary medias" (see Media studies) include:

- Speech and other mouth-formed sounds, e.g. screaming;
- Sign language using hand or body movements, e.g. winking;
- Other non-verbal means of communication include clothing (see dress code) and other forms of appearance, as well as different accentuations in the living, food and construction culture.

Technical means of communication

- with hands or technical aids written characters on paper or another substrate as a writing medium (letter, message);
- Printed media produced with the help of printing technology;
- Playback of sounds or images (in Image Media) by record players such as tape recorders and projectors for slide shows or movies;
- Transmission of speech by telephone or writing by telegraph, mostly to a single addressee; satellite radio.

== Communication theory ==
Means of communication are often differentiated in models of communication:

- in terms of reaching and determining the target audience of a means of communication, whether individual communication, group communication and mass communication;
- in terms of the technical components in natural and technical means of communication;
- in terms of the components of speech in verbal and nonverbal communication.

Media as a means of communication in the future will be distinguished:

- by data storage, broadcasting media and processing media, especially to record, reproduce and reduplicate media content.
- by primary, secondary, tertiary and quaternary media, depending on the technology used by sender and recipient.

== Mass media ==
Mass media refers to reaching many recipients from one – or less than one – sender simultaneously or nearly simultaneously.

- Transmission of information via printing products in diverse forms (book, pamphlet, xerography, poster, mail merge, newspaper)
- Transmission of language, music or other sound radio waves (radio broadcasting)
- Transmission of visual image and sound via radio wave (television)
- The most up-to-date means of communication in a long chain of innovation is the Internet

Due to their wide dissemination, mass media are suitable for providing the majority of the population with the same information.

== Electronic media ==
Developments in telecommunications have provided for media the ability to conduct long-distance communication via analog and digital media:

- Analog telecommunications include some radio systems, historical telephony systems, and historical television broadcasts.
- Digital telecommunications allow for computer-mediated communication, telegraphy, computer networks, digital radio, digital telephony and digital television.

Modern communication media include long-distance exchanges between larger numbers of people (many-to-many communication via email, Internet forums, and telecommunications ports). Traditional broadcast media and mass media favor one-to-many communication (television, cinema, radio, newspaper, magazines, and social media).

=== Social media ===
Electronic media, specifically social media have become one of the top forms of media that people use in the twenty-first century. The percent of people that use social media and social networking outlets rose dramatically from 5% in 2005 to 79% in 2019. Instagram, Twitter, Pinterest, TikTok, and Facebook are the most commonly used social media platforms. The average time that an individual spends on social media is 2.5 hours a day. This exponential increase of social media has additionally caused a change in which people communicate with others as well as receive information. About 53% use social media to read/watch the news. Many people use the information specifically from social media influencers to understand more about a topic, business, or organization. Social media has now been made part of everyday news production for journalists around the world. Not only does social media provide more connection between readers and journalists, but it also cultivates the participation and community amongst technical communicators and their audiences, clients, and stakeholders.

=== Gaming ===
==== Online ====
The gaming community has grown exponentially, and about 65% have taken to playing with others, whether online or in-person. Players online will communicate through the system of microphone applicability either through the game or a third-party application such as Discord. The improvements upon connectivity and software allowed for players online to keep in touch and game instantaneously, disregarding location almost entirely. With online gaming platforms it has been noted that they support diverse social gaming communities allowing players to feel a sense of belonging through the screen.

==== Age ====
Gaming is an activity shared amongst others regardless of age, allowing for a diverse group of players to connect and enjoy their favorite games with. This helps with creating or maintaining relationships: friendships, family, or a significant other.

==== Ratings and content ====
As with most interactive media content, games have ratings to assist in choosing appropriate games regarding younger audiences. This is done by ESRB ratings and consists of the following: E for Everyone, E for Everyone 10+, T for Teen, and M for Mature 18+. Whenever a new game is released, it is reviewed by associations to determine a suitable rating so younger audiences do not consume harmful or inappropriate content. With these ratings it helps the risks and effects of gaming on younger audiences because the exposure of media is believed to influence children's attitudes, beliefs, and behaviors.

==== Reach ====
The usage and consumption of gaming has tremendously increased within the last decade with estimates of around 2.3 billion people from around the world playing digital and online video games. The growth rate for the global market for gaming was expected to grow 6.2% towards 2020. Areas like Latin America had a 20.1% increase, Asia-Pacific - 9.2%, North America - 4.0%, and Europe -11.7%.

==== Communication ====
Studies show that digital and online gaming can be used as a communication method to aid in scientific research and create interaction. The narrative, layout, and gaming features all share a relationship that can deliver meaning and value that make games an innovative communication tool. Research-focused games showed a connection towards a greater usage of dialogue within the science community as players had the opportunity to address issues with a game with themselves and scientists. This helped to push the understanding of how gaming and players can help advance scientific research via communication through games.

=== vBook ===
A vBook is an eBook that is digital first media with embedded video, images, graphs, tables, text, and other useful media.

=== E-Book ===
An E-book combines reading and listening media interaction. It is compact and can store a large amount of data which has made them very popular in classrooms.

== Regulations ==
The role of regulatory authorities (license broadcaster institutions, content providers, platforms) and the resistance to political and commercial interference in the autonomy of the media sector are both considered as significant components of media independence. In order to ensure media independence, regulatory authorities should be placed outside of governments' directives. This can be measured through legislation, agency statutes and rules.

=== Government regulations ===
==== Licensing ====
In the United States, the Radio Act of 1927 established that the radio frequency spectrum was public property. This prohibited private organizations from owning any portion of the spectrum. A broadcast license is typically given to broadcasters by communications regulators, allowing them to broadcast on a certain frequency and typically in a specific geographical location. Licensing is done by regulators in order to manage a broadcasting medium and as a method to prevent the concentration of media ownership.

Licensing has been criticized for an alleged lack of transparency. Regulatory authorities in certain countries have been accused of exhibiting political bias in favor of the government or ruling party, which has resulted in some prospective broadcasters being denied licenses or being threatened with license withdrawal. As a consequence, there has been a decrease in diversity of content and views in certain countries due to actions made against broadcasters by states via their licensing authorities. This can have an impact on competition and may lead to an excessive concentration of power with potential influence on public opinion. Examples include the failure to renew or retain licenses for editorially critical media, reducing the regulator's competences and mandates for action, and a lack of due process in the adoption of regulatory decisions.

==== Internet regulation ====
Governments worldwide have sought to extend regulation to internet companies, whether connectivity providers or application service providers, and whether domestically or foreign-based. The impact on journalistic content can be severe, as internet companies can err too much on the side of caution and take down news reports, including algorithmically, while offering inadequate opportunities for redress to the affected news producers.

=== Self-regulation ===
==== At the regional level ====
In Western Europe, self-regulation provides an alternative to state regulatory authorities. In such contexts, newspapers have historically been free of licensing and regulation, and there has been repeated pressure for them to self-regulate or at least to have in-house ombudsmen. However, it has often been difficult to establish meaningful self-regulatory entities.

In many cases, self-regulations exists in the shadow of state regulation, and is conscious of the possibility of state intervention. In many countries in Central and Eastern Europe, self-regulatory structures seems to be lacking or have not historically been perceived as efficient and effective.

The rise of satellite channels that delivered directly to viewers, or through cable or online systems, renders much larger the sphere of unregulated programing. There are, however, varying efforts to regulate the access of programmers to satellite transponders in parts of the Western Europe, North America, the Arab region and in Asia and the Pacific. The Arab Satellite Broadcasting Charter was an example of efforts to bring formal standards and some regulatory authority to bear on what is transmitted, but it appears to not have been implemented.

==== International organizations and NGOs ====
Self-regulation is expressed as a preferential system by journalists but also as a support for media freedom and development organizations by intergovernmental organizations such as UNESCO and non-governmental organizations. There has been a continued trend of establishing self-regulatory bodies, such as press councils, in conflict and post-conflict situations.

Major internet companies have responded to pressure by governments and the public by elaborating self-regulatory and complaints systems at the individual company level, using principles they have developed under the framework of the Global Network Initiative. The Global Network Initiative has grown to include several large telecom companies alongside internet companies such as Google, Facebook and others, as well as civil society organizations and academics.

The European Commission's 2013 publication, ICT Technology Sector Guide on Implementing the United Nations Guiding Principles on Business and Human Rights, impacts on the presence of independent journalism by defining the limits of what should or should not be carried and prioritized in the most popular digital spaces.

==== Private sector ====
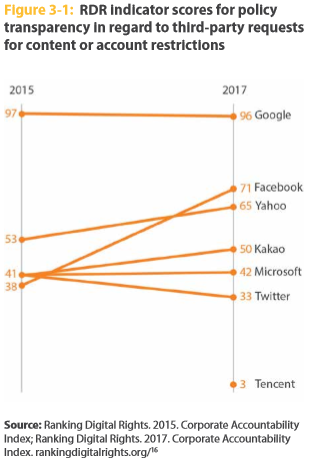
Ranking Digital Rights indicator scores for policy transparency in regards to third-party requests for content or account restriction

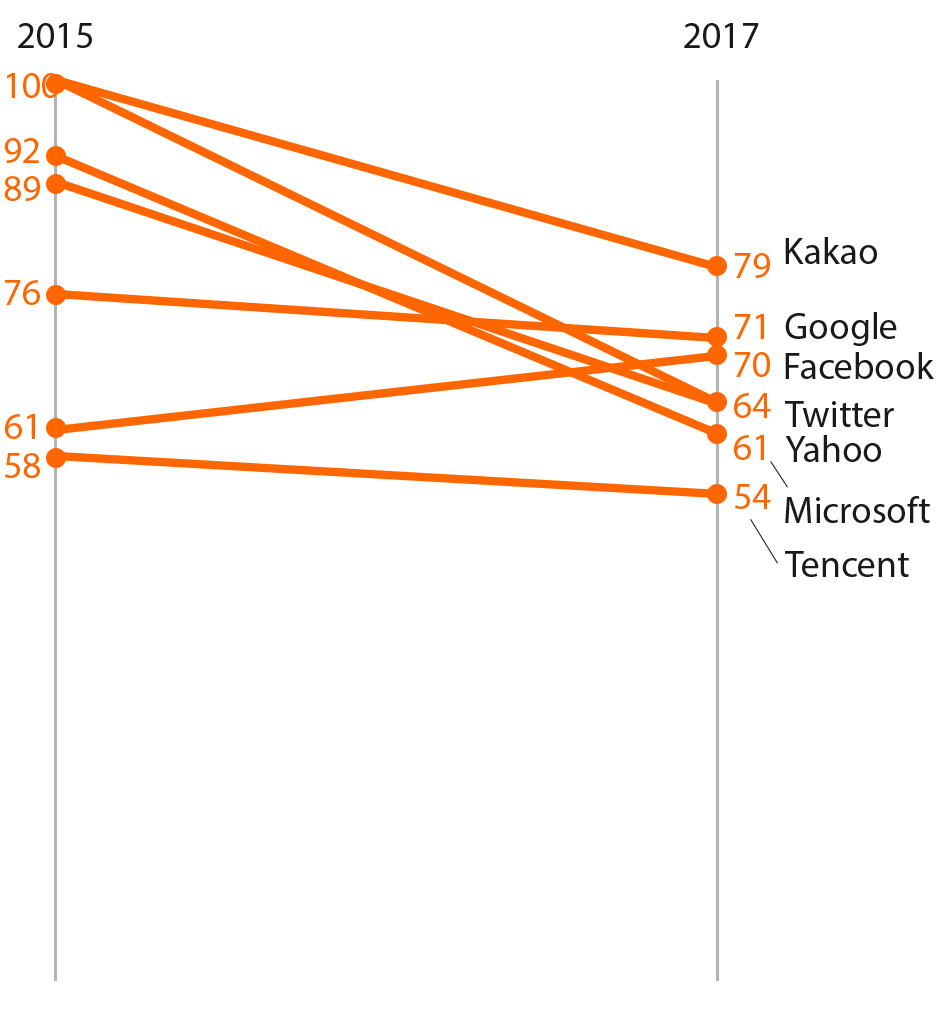
Ranking Digital Rights indicator scores for policy transparency in regard to their terms of service enforcement (which impact upon content or account restrictions)

Public pressure on technology giants has motivated the development of new strategies aimed not only at identifying 'fake news', but also at eliminating some of the structural causes of their emergence and proliferation. Facebook has created new buttons for users to report content they believe is false, following previous strategies aimed at countering hate speech and harassment online. These changes reflect broader transformations occurring among tech giants to increase their transparency. As indicated by the Ranking Digital Rights Corporate Accountability Index, most large internet companies have reportedly become relatively more forthcoming in terms of their policies about transparency in regard to third party requests to remove or access content, especially in the case of requests from governments. At the same time, however, the study signaled a number of companies that have become more opaque when it comes to disclosing how they enforce their own terms of service, in restricting certain types of content and account. State governments can also use "Fake news" in order to spread propaganda.

==== Fact-checking and news literacy ====
In addition to responding to pressure for more clearly defined self-regulatory mechanisms, and galvanized by the debates over so-called 'fake news', internet companies such as Facebook have launched campaigns to educate users about how to more easily distinguish between 'fake news' and real news sources. Ahead of the United Kingdom national election in 2017, for example, Facebook published a series of advertisements in newspapers with 'Tips for Spotting False News' which suggested 10 things that might signal whether a story is genuine or not. There have also been broader initiatives bringing together a variety of donors and actors to promote fact-checking and news literacy, such as the News Integrity Initiative at the City University of New York's School of Journalism. This US$14 million investment by groups including the Ford Foundation and Facebook was launched in 2017 so its full impact remains to be seen. It will, however, complement the offerings of other networks such as the International Fact-Checking Network launched by the Poynter Institute in 2015 which seeks to outline the parameters of the field. Instagram has also created a way to potentially expose "fake news" that is posted on the site. After looking into the site, it seemed as more than a place for political memes, but a weaponized platform, instead of the creative space it used to be. Since that, Instagram has started to put warning labels on certain stories or posts if third-party fact checkers believe that false information is being spread. Instagram works with these fact checkers to ensure that no false information is being spread around the site. Instagram started this work in 2019, following Facebook with the idea as they started fact checking in 2016.

== See also ==
- Media history

== Bibliography ==
General

- Lothar Hoffmann, Kommunikationsmittel: Fachsprache: eine Einführung, 1976
- Michael Franz, Electric Laokoon: Zeichen und Medien, von der Lochkarte zur Grammatologie, 2007, ISBN 978-3-05-003504-8
- Horst Völz, Das ist Information. Shaker Verlag, Aachen 2017, ISBN 978-3-8440-5587-0.

Natural communication

- Jean Werner Sommer, Kommunikationsmittel: Wort und Sprache, 1970
- Beat Pfister, Tobias Kaufmann: Sprachverarbeitung: Grundlagen und Methoden der Sprachsynthese und Spracherkennung, 2008, ISBN 978-3-540-75909-6
- Renate Rathmayr, Nonverbale Kommunikationsmittel und ihre Versprachlichung, 1987

Mass media

- Jörg Aufermann, Hans Bohrmann, Massenkommunikationsmittel, 1968
- Fritz Eberhard, Optische und akustische Massenkommunikationsmittel, 1967
- Theodor Bücher, Pädagogik der Massenkommunikationsmittel, 1967
- Hans Kaspar Platte, Soziologie der Massenkommunikationsmittel, 1965

Social means of communication

- Daniel Michelis, Thomas Schildhauer (2010). Social Media Handbuch – Theorien, Methoden, Modelle. Baden-Baden: Nomos. p. 327. ISBN 978-3-8329-5470-3.
- Daniel Michelis, Thomas Schildhauer (2012). Social Media Handbuch - Theorien, Methoden, Modelle und Praxis (2. updated and extended ed.). Baden-Baden: Nomos. p. 358. ISBN 978-3-8329-7121-2.
