= Simon G. J. Mochrie =

Physicist specializing in biophysics and soft matter

- Education: University of Oxford (BA); Massachusetts Institute of Technology (PhD, 1985)
- Known for: X-ray photon correlation spectroscopy (XPCS); Chromatin organization and dynamics; Conserved-current loop extrusion (CCLE) model
- Awards: Arthur H. Compton Award (2009); Allen Distinguished Investigator (2020); Dylan Hixon '88 Prize for Teaching Excellence (2021)
- Scientific career
- Fields: Biophysics; Condensed matter physics; Soft matter
- Workplaces: Yale University (2000–present); Massachusetts Institute of Technology; AT&T Bell Laboratories
- Website: mochrielab.yale.edu

Simon G. J. Mochrie is a professor of Physics and Applied Physics at Yale University. His research focuses on experimental biophysics, soft condensed matter physics, and quantitative microscopy. He is known for x-ray photon correlation spectroscopy (XPCS), a technique he first demonstrated in 1991 that is now used at synchrotron facilities worldwide.

== Education and career ==
Mochrie completed a BA at the University of Oxford, followed by a PhD (Physics, 1985) at the Massachusetts Institute of Technology (MIT), where he studied phase transitions in systems exhibiting low-dimensional behavior. He subsequently worked as a Member of Technical Staff at AT&T Bell Laboratories and then on the faculty at MIT before joining Yale University in 2000 as Professor of Physics and Applied Physics.

In 2008, Mochrie co-founded the Yale Integrated Graduate Program in Physical and Engineering Biology (PEB) with Lynne Regan, Corey O'Hern, and Thomas D. Pollard. The program trains graduate students to apply physical and engineering approaches to biological systems across traditional disciplinary boundaries.

== Research ==
=== X-ray photon correlation spectroscopy ===
Mochrie developed x-ray photon correlation spectroscopy (XPCS), a technique that uses the coherent scattering of synchrotron X-rays to characterize the slow dynamics of polymeric and colloidal systems on shorter length scales than achievable with optical methods. The method was first demonstrated by Mochrie and Mark Sutton in 1991 and has since motivated the implementation of dedicated XPCS beamlines at synchrotron facilities around the world. This work was recognized with the 2009 Arthur H. Compton Award from the Advanced Photon Source, shared with Gerhard Grübel and Mark Sutton.

=== Condensed matter and soft matter physics ===
Earlier in his career, Mochrie carried out experimental studies of the properties, phase behavior, and phase transitions of soft matter, surfaces, and biomaterials using high-resolution X-ray scattering techniques.

=== Biological physics ===
Mochrie's more recent research focuses on the physics of living materials. His laboratory uses theoretical and computational approaches together with experimental methods including optical tweezers, fast-scanning random-access STED microscopy, and quantitative microscopy to study chromatin organization and dynamics. Current projects include single-molecule optical tweezer measurements on nucleosomes, protein degradation in yeast, and the role of peripheral chromatin in nuclear mechanics.

A contribution of his group is the conserved-current loop extrusion (CCLE) model, which interprets loop-extruding cohesin as a conserved current to self-consistently predict chromatin spatial organization from cohesin distributions alone, applicable across both vertebrate and non-vertebrate organisms.

In other work, Mochrie used small-angle X-ray scattering on single insect scales to identify ordered photonic nanostructures grown through the self-organizing propensity of cellular lipid bilayer membranes. He also demonstrated that the folding and unfolding thermodynamics of repeat proteins can be quantitatively described by the classical one-dimensional Ising model.

== Awards and honors ==
- Arthur H. Compton Award (2009) – Awarded by the Advanced Photon Source, shared with Gerhard Grübel (DESY) and Mark Sutton (McGill University), for pioneering efforts in x-ray photon correlation spectroscopy.
- Allen Distinguished Investigator (2020) – Awarded by The Paul G. Allen Frontiers Group, a division of the Allen Institute. Co-led (with Megan C. King) a project on the physical and molecular forces maintaining nuclear size, funded at $1.5 million over three years.
- Dylan Hixon '88 Prize for Teaching Excellence in the Natural Sciences (2021) – One of the highest teaching honors bestowed by Yale College, recognizing a "towering figure" in undergraduate education.

== Selected publications ==
- Mochrie, S.G.J.; Mayes, A.M.; Sandy, A.R.; Sutton, M.; Brauer, S.; Stephenson, G.B.; Abernathy, D.L.; Grübel, G. (1997). "Dynamics of Block Copolymer Micelles Revealed by X-Ray Intensity Fluctuation Spectroscopy". Physical Review Letters. 78 (7): 1275–1278. Bibcode:1997PhRvL..78.1275M. doi:10.1103/PhysRevLett.78.1275.
- Bailey, Mary Lou P.; Surovtsev, Ivan; Williams, Jessica F.; Yan, Hao; Yuan, Tianyu; Li, Kevin; Duseau, Katherine; Mochrie, Simon G.J.; King, Megan C. (2023). "Loops and the activity of loop extrusion factors constrain chromatin dynamics". Molecular Biology of the Cell. 34 (7): ar78. doi:10.1091/mbc.E23-04-0119. PMC 10398873. PMID 37133434.
- Yuan, Tianyu; Yan, Hao; Li, Kevin C.; Surovtsev, Ivan; King, Megan C.; Mochrie, Simon G.J. (2024). "Cohesin distribution alone predicts chromatin organization in yeast via conserved-current loop extrusion". Genome Biology. 25: 293. doi:10.1186/s13059-024-03432-w.
- Yuan, Tianyu; Yan, Hao; Bailey, Mary Lou P.; Williams, Jessica F.; Surovtsev, Ivan; King, Megan C.; Mochrie, Simon G.J. (2024). "Effect of loops on the mean-square displacement of Rouse-model chromatin". Physical Review E. 109 (4) 044502. doi:10.1103/PhysRevE.109.044502. PMID 38755928.
