= Yokogawa Electric =

Japanese electrical engineering company

Yokogawa Electric Corporation

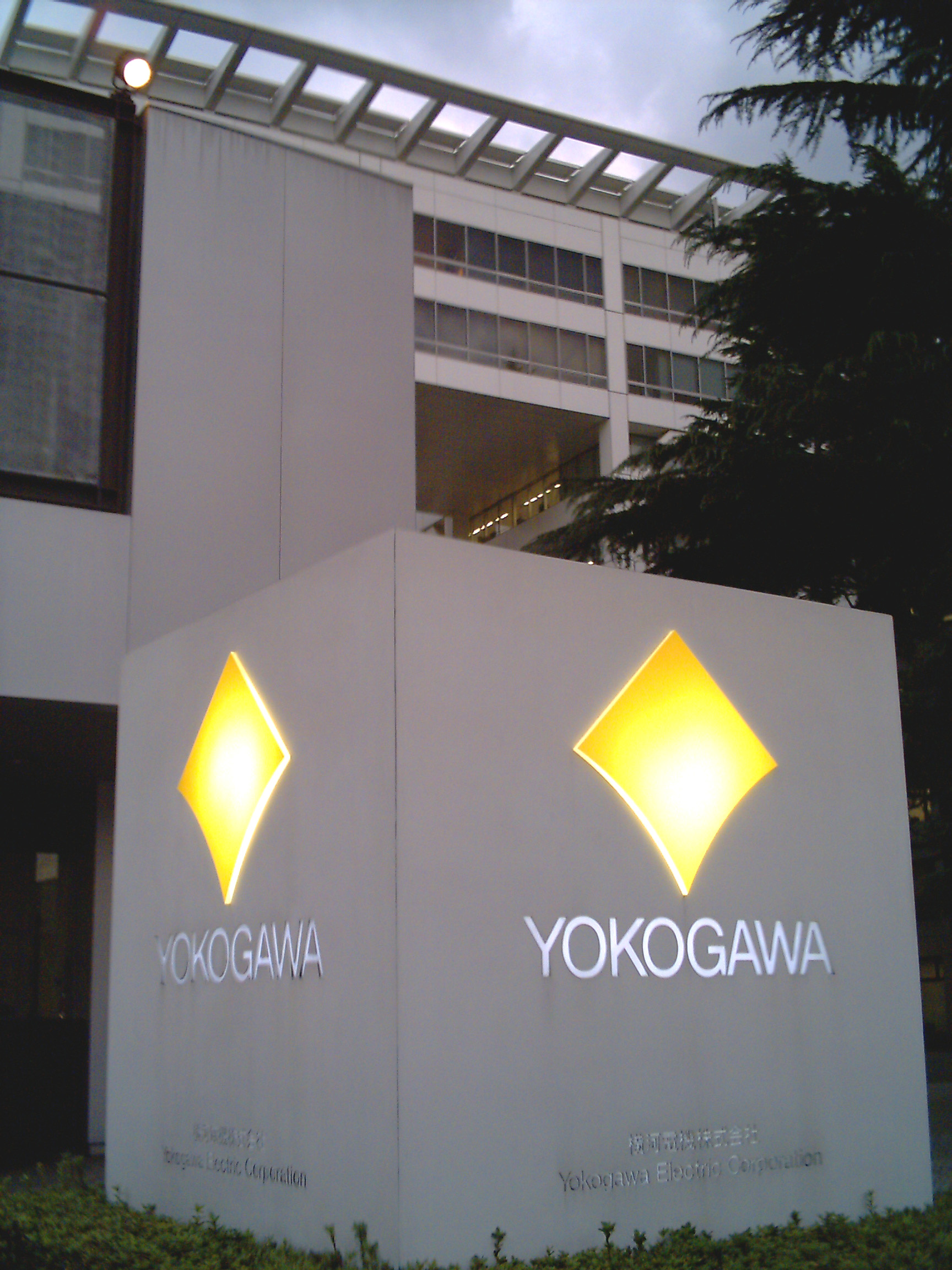
- Headquarters in Musashino, Tokyo
- Native name: 横河電機株式会社
- Romanized name: Yokogawa-denki Kabushiki-kaisha
- Type: Public (K.K)
- Traded as: TYO: 6841; Nikkei 225 Component
- Industry: Electrical equipment, IT
- Founded: September 1, 1915; 111 years ago
- Founders: John F. Yokogawa; Ichiro Yokogawa; Shin Aoki
- Headquarters: 2-9-32 Nakacho, Musashino, Tokyo, Japan
- Area served: Worldwide
- Key people: Hitoshi Nara (chairman); Kunimasa Shigeno (president and CEO)
- Products: Industrial automation; Test and measurement hardware and software
- Revenue: ▲$ 3.7 billion USD (FY 2017) (¥404.4 billion JPY) (FY 2019)
- Net income: ▲$ 156 million USD (FY 2012) (¥14.7 billion JPY) (FY 2019)
- Number of employees: ▲18,107 (consolidated) (as of March 31, 2019)
- Subsidiaries: 84 (15 in Japan, 69 overseas)
- Website: Official website

Yokogawa Electric Corporation (横河電機株式会社, Yokogawa-denki Kabushiki-kaisha) is a Japanese multinational electrical engineering and software company, with businesses based on its measurement, control, and information technologies.

It has a global workforce of over 19,000 employees, 84 subsidiary and 3 affiliated companies operating in 55 countries. The company is listed on the Tokyo Stock Exchange and is a constituent of the Nikkei 225 stock index.

Yokogawa pioneered the development of distributed control systems and introduced its Centum series DCS in 1975.

Some of Yokogawa's most recognizable products are production control systems, test and measurement instruments, pressure transmitters, flow meters, oxygen analyzers, fieldbus instruments, manufacturing execution systems and advanced process control.

== History ==
Yokogawa traces its roots back to 1915, when Dr. Tamisuke Yokogawa, a renowned architect, established an electric meter research institute in Shibuya, Tokyo. After pioneering the development and production of electric meters in Japan, this enterprise was incorporated in 1920 as Yokogawa Electric Works Ltd.

In 1933 Yokogawa began the research and manufacture of aircraft instruments and flow, temperature, and pressure controllers. In the years following the war, Yokogawa went public, developed its first electronic recorders, signed a technical assistance agreement for industrial instruments with the U.S. firm Foxboro, and opened its first overseas sales office (New York).

In the 1960s the company made a full-scale entry into the industrial analyzer market and launched the development, manufacturing, and sales of vortex flowmeters, and in the decade following established its first manufacturing plant outside Japan (Singapore), opened a sales office in Europe, and became one of the first companies to bring a distributed process control system to market. In 1983 Yokogawa merged with Hokushin Electric Works and, towards the end of the decade, entered the high-frequency measuring instrument business. In the 1990s, Yokogawa established an office in Bahrain to oversee its business in the Middle East and entered the confocal scanner and biotechnology businesses.

In 2002 the firm continued its growth with the acquisition of Ando Electric, and in 2005 set the stage for a new level of globalization in its industrial automation business with the establishment of Yokogawa Electric International in Singapore. In 2008 the company entered the drug discovery support market with a new bio test system.

In April 2020, Yokogawa acquired Scarborough-based Fluid Imaging Technologies. Terms of the deal were not disclosed.

In 2021, Yokogawa focused on cloud-based solutions and industrial IoT applications. The company launched the OpreX Control Care cloud service and acquired Industrial Control Systems, Inc. (ICSI) to strengthen its industrial cybersecurity offerings.

In 2026, Yokogawa was contracted to provide the control systems for the first Rolls-Royce SMR nuclear reactors.

== Businesses and main products ==
- Yokogawa's main businesses are industrial automation and test and measurement hardware and software.
- Some of Yokogawa's main hardware products are Pressure Transmitters, Flow meters, analysers, controllers, recorders and data acquisition equipment.
- Yokogawa products are used in different industries requiring process control systems. Depending on the size of the project and the requirements, Yokogawa offers various control systems: DCS, PLC, SCADA and ESD (emergency shutdown). In collaboration with Shell Global Solutions, Yokogawa also offers advanced process control (APC) solutions for refineries, petrochemical plants, and chemical plants.
- Centum, Yokogawa's flagship DCS, has the largest capacity among DCSs, supporting up to 1 million device tags.
- Yokogawa manufactures field instruments, test and measurement instruments, and semi-conductor related products.
- Yokogawa designs and manufactures the most advanced confocal spinning disks used in confocal microscopy.

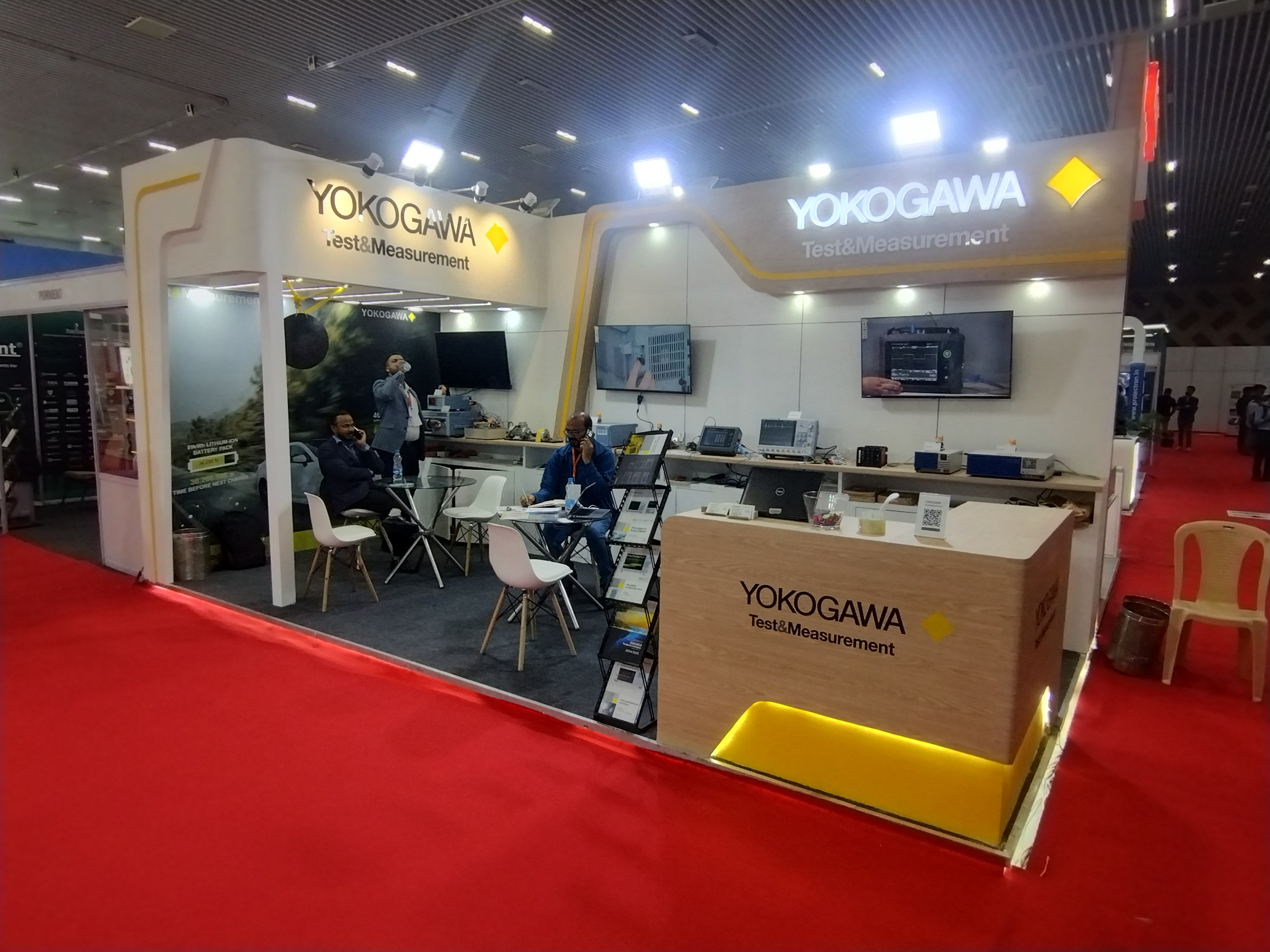
Yokogawa Electric at Auto EV Bharat 4.0, KTPO Exhibition Centre (2025)

== Major office locations ==
- Musashino (near Mitaka Station) (world headquarters and East Asia regional office)
- Amersfoort, The Netherlands (Europe regional office)
- Bahrain (Middle East and Africa regional office)
- Bangalore, India (South Asia regional office)
- Moscow, Russia (CIS countries headquarters)
- Sugar Land, Texas, USA (North & Central America regional office)
- Singapore (Asean, Oceania, South Asia and Taiwan regional office)
- São Paulo, (South America regional office)
- Khobar, Saudi Arabia
- Jubail, Saudi Arabia
- Catania, Italy

== Trademark products of Yokogawa ==
- DPharp EJA – Pressure Transmitter with Silicon Resonant Technology
- DPharp EJX – Pressure Transmitter with Silicon Resonant Technology and SIL2 Certification
- Rotamass – Coriolis Mass Flow and Density Meters
- Indicator FVX – Fieldbus indicator
- Valve Positioner YVP – Fieldbus positioner
- ADMag AXF – Magnetic Flowmeter for high-end technology use
- ADMag CA – Magnetic Flowmeter for substances without apparent electrode
- ADMag SE – magnetic flowmeter for general use
- Rotameter – Rotameter
- DY – Digital Vortex Flowmeter
- YTA – SMART Temperature Transmitter
- US – Ultrasonic Flowmeter
- Centum CS3000 and Centum VP – Distributed Control Systems
- ProSafe-RS – Safety Instrumented System
- ProSafe-SLS – Solid State Logic Solver - Safety Instrumented System
- Fast/Tools – Web-based SCADA system
- Stardom – Network based control systems
- DXAdvanced – Data Acquisition Station (DAQ)
- DAQMaster – Data logger
- SMARTDAC+ – SMART Data Acquisition (DAQ)
- ISA100 – Wireless Transmittor
- GC8000 - Process Gas Chromatograph
- Petro-SIM- Kinetic Process Simulator

== Sponsored sports teams ==
- Yokogawa Musashino Atlastars – rugby
- Yokogawa Musashino F.C. – Football (soccer)
- Yokogawa Tiger F.C. – Football (soccer) [Malaysia]
