= Process automation system =

System in industrial plants

A process automation or automation system (PAS) is used to automatically control a process such as chemical, oil refineries, paper and pulp factories. The PAS often uses a network to interconnect sensors, controllers, operator terminals and actuators. A PAS is often based on open standards in contrast to a DCS (distributed control system), which is traditionally proprietary. However in recent times the PAS is considered to be more associated with SCADA systems.

PAS is the lowest level of automation, while MES (manufacturing execution system) is considered to be directly positioned above a PAS.

Process automation involves using sensors, actuators, computer technology and software engineering to help power plants and factories in industries as diverse as paper, mining and cement operate more efficiently and safely.

== The background and technology ==
In the absence of process automation, plant operators have to physically monitor performance values and the quality of outputs to determine the best settings on which to run the production equipment. Maintenance is carried out at set intervals. This generally results in operational inefficiency and unsafe operating conditions.

Process automation simplifies this with the help of sensors at thousands of spots around the plant that collect data on temperatures, pressures, flows and so on. The information is stored and analyzed on a computer and the entire plant and each piece of production equipment can be monitored on a large screen in a control room.

Plant operating settings are then automatically adjusted to achieve the optimum production. Plant operators can manually override the process automation systems when necessary.

== Process automation and energy efficiency ==
Process automation systems typically consist of several components that work together to control and monitor the process. These components may include:

1. Sensors: Sensors measure various parameters such as temperature, pressure, flow rate, and chemical composition. These sensors generate signals that are transmitted to the controller.
2. Controllers: Controllers are devices that receive input signals from the sensors and use that information to make decisions about adjusting the process. Controllers can be simple or complex, depending on the complexity of the process being controlled.
3. Actuators: Actuators are devices that are used to adjust the process based on the decisions made by the controller. For example, an actuator may be used to adjust the flow rate of a fluid or to adjust the position of a valve.
4. Operator interfaces: Operator interfaces are used by human operators to monitor the process and make manual adjustments if necessary. These interfaces may include computer screens, buttons, and other controls.
5. Communication networks: Communication networks are used to interconnect the various components of the automation system. These networks may use wired or wireless connections and may be based on standard protocols such as Ethernet or wireless communication protocols.

Process automation systems can be used in various industries, including chemical, oil and gas, pharmaceutical, food and beverage, and many others. These systems can help industries to operate more efficiently, reduce costs, and improve safety by reducing the risk of human error.
