= Azbil =

Japanese manufacturing company

Azbil Corporation
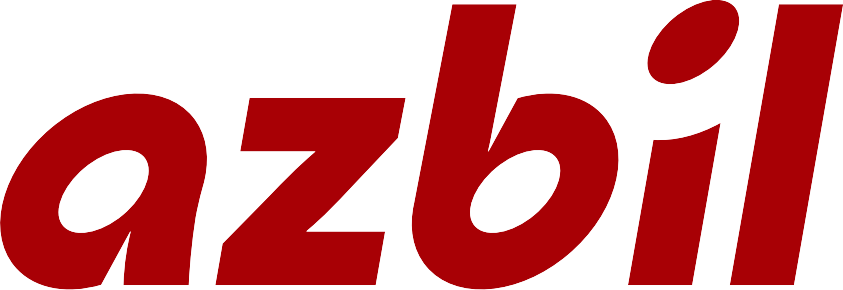
- Logo used since 2008

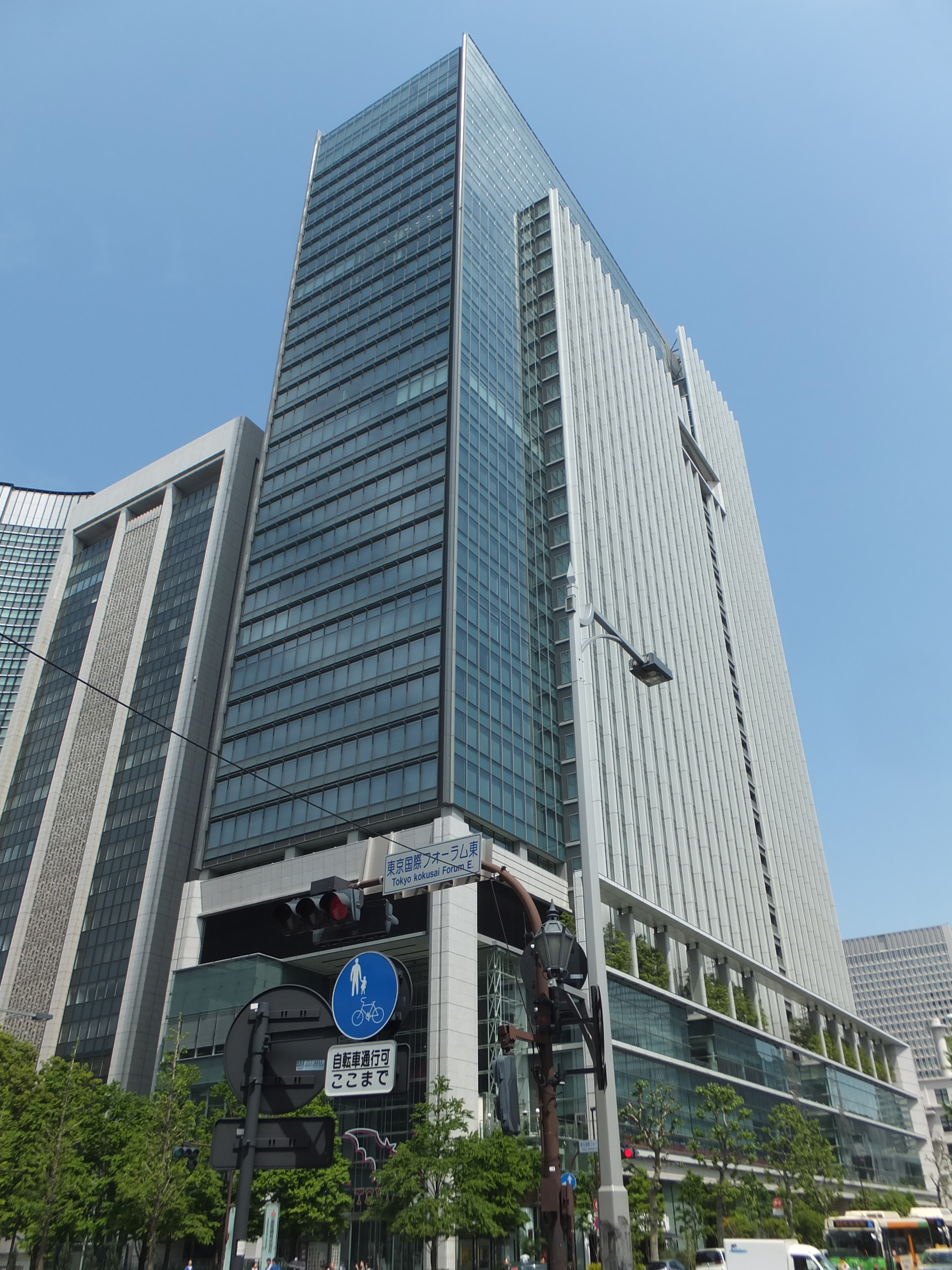
- Headquarters at the Tokyo Building in Marunouchi, Chiyoda, Tokyo
- Native name: アズビル株式会社
- Romanized name: Azubiru Kabushiki Kaisha
- Formerly: Yamatake Corporation
- Company type: Public
- Traded as: TYO: 6845
- Industry: Electrical equipment Building automation
- Founder: YAMAGUCHI Takehiko
- Headquarters: Tokyo Building, 2-7-3, Marunouchi, Chiyoda, Tokyo 100-6419, Japan
- Area served: Worldwide
- Key people: YAMAMOTO Kiyohiro (Director and CEO); YOKOTA Takayuki (Director); KATSUTA Hisaya (Director)
- Products: Control valve; Sensor; Actuator
- Number of employees: 8,922 (consolidated); 5,052 (non-consolidated) (2025)
- Website: azbil.com

Azbil Corporation is a Japanese manufacturer of control and measurement instruments, founded in 1906.

== azbil Group Companies ==
The following are profiles of domestic and overseas subsidiaries and affiliates of the azbil Group.

=== Japan ===
- Azbil Corporation
- Azbil Trading Co., Ltd.
- Azbil Yamatake Friendly Co., Ltd.
- Azbil Kimmon Co., Ltd.
- Azbil Kyoto Co., Ltd.
- Azbil TA Co., Ltd.
- Azbil Taishin Co., Ltd.
- Tem-tech Lab

=== Overseas ===
==== Asia Pacific ====
- Azbil Korea Co., Ltd.
- Azbil Taiwan Co., Ltd.
- Azbil Kimmon Technology Corporation
- Azbil Vietnam Co., Ltd.
- Azbil Vietnam Production Company Limited
- Azbil India Private Limited
- Azbil (Thailand) Co., Ltd.
- Azbil Production (Thailand) Co., Ltd.
- Azbil Philippines Corporation
- Azbil Malaysia Sdn. Bhd.
- Azbil Corporation Strategic Planning & Development Office for Southeast Asia
- Azbil Singapore Pte. Ltd.
- PT. Azbil Berca Indonesia
- Azbil Control Instruments (Dalian) Co., Ltd.
- Azbil Information Technology Center (Dalian) Co., Ltd.
- Azbil Control Solutions (Shanghai) Co., Ltd.
- Shanghai Azbil Automation Co., Ltd.
- Azbil Hong Kong Limited

==== USA ====
- Azbil North America Research and Development, Inc.
- Azbil North America, Inc.

==== Latin America ====
- Azbil Mexico, S. de R.L. de C.V.

==== Europe ====
- Azbil Europe NV

==== Middle East ====
- Azbil Saudi Limited
- Azbil Corporation Abu Dhabi Branch
- Azbil Corporation Middle East Branch

== See also ==
- Heating, ventilation, and air conditioning
- Distributed control system
- Industrial control system
