= European XFEL =

Multinational X-ray research laser facility in Germany

Coordinates: 53.589°N 9.829°E

European X-Ray Free-Electron Laser Facility GmbH
- Type: Fundamental research
- Founded: 23 September 2009; 16 years ago
- Headquarters: Schenefeld, Germany
- Members: 12 partner countries: Denmark; DAFHES (Danish Agency for Higher Education and Science); France; CEA (Commissariat à l'énergie atomique et aux énergies alternatives); CNRS (Centre national de la recherche scientifique); Germany; DESY (Deutsches Elektronen-Synchrotron); Hungary; NRDI Office (National Research, Development and Innovation Office); Italy; INFN (Istituto Nazionale di Fisica Nucleare); CNR (Consiglio Nazionale delle Ricerche); Poland; NCBJ (National Centre for Nuclear Research); Russia; NRC KI (National Research Centre "Kurchatov Institute"); Slovakia; Spain; Sweden; VR (Swedish Research Council); Switzerland; United Kingdom; UKRI (UK Research and Innovation)
- Website: www.xfel.eu

All member nations of the European XFEL project are highlighted in dark purple.

The European X-Ray Free-Electron Laser Facility (European XFEL) is an X-ray research laser facility. The international project has twelve participating countries; nine shareholders at the time of commissioning (Denmark, France, Germany, Hungary, Poland, Russia, Slovakia, Sweden and Switzerland), later joined by three other partners (Italy, Spain and the United Kingdom), is located in the German federal states of Hamburg and Schleswig-Holstein. A free-electron laser generates high-intensity electromagnetic radiation by accelerating electrons to relativistic speeds and directing them through special magnetic structures. The European XFEL is constructed such that the electrons produce X-ray light in synchronisation, resulting in high-intensity X-ray pulses with the properties of laser light and at intensities much brighter than those produced by conventional synchrotron light sources.

== Location ==
The 3.4-kilometre (2.1 mi) long tunnel for the European XFEL housing the superconducting linear accelerator and photon beamlines runs 6 to 38 m (20 to 125 ft) underground from the site of the DESY research center in Hamburg to the town of Schenefeld in Schleswig-Holstein, where the experimental stations, laboratories and administrative buildings are located.

== Accelerator ==
Electrons are accelerated to an energy of up to 17.5 GeV by a 2.1 km (1.3 mi) long linear accelerator with superconducting RF-cavities. The use of superconducting acceleration elements developed at DESY allows up to 27,000 repetitions per second, significantly more than other X-ray lasers in the U.S. and Japan can achieve. The electrons are then introduced into the magnetic fields of special arrays of magnets called undulators, where they follow slalom-like trajectories resulting in the emission of X-rays whose wavelength is in the range of 0.05 to 4.7 nm.

== X-ray laser ==
The X-rays are generated by self-amplified spontaneous emission (SASE), where electrons interact with the radiation that they or their neighbours emit. Since it is not possible to build mirrors to reflect the X-rays for multiple passes through the electron beam gain medium, as with light lasers, the X-rays are generated in a single pass through the beam. The result is spontaneous emission of X-ray photons which are coherent (in phase) like laser light, unlike X-rays emitted by ordinary sources like X-ray machines, which are incoherent. The peak brilliance of the European XFEL is billions of times higher than that of conventional X-ray light sources, while the average brilliance is 10,000 times higher. The higher electron energy allows the production of shorter wavelengths. The duration of the light pulses can be less than 100 femtoseconds.

== Instruments ==
There are seven instruments at European XFEL, run by scientists from all over the world.

=== Femtosecond X-ray Experiments (FXE) ===
The FXE instrument allows ultrafast pump-probe experiments on time scales of less than 100 femtoseconds The research emphasis of FXE is on the measurement of ultrafast, often nonlinear chemical or biochemical reactions of samples in solutions or condensed matter with hard X-ray radiation. The instrument comprises two independent X-ray emission spectrometers, which can be used at the same time with a large-area 1 megapixel detector for scattering examinations. To excite samples, the instrument additionally has an ultra-fast laser that can be used from ultraviolet (UV) to infrared (IR).

=== High Energy Density (HED) and HIBEF UC ===
The instrument has been developed together with the HIBEF user consortium (HIBEF UC) a unique platform for experiments in which matter can be investigated under extreme pressure, temperature or electrical field conditions using hard X-rays. HED and the HIBEF user consortium have access to high-energy optical lasers and pulsed magnets. Scientific applications include the investigation of matter such as that found inside exoplanets, high-density plasmas and matter under extreme pressures or high magnetic fields. The first user experiment took place in May 2019. Since then, further devices have been put into operation and optimised, such as the focussing, the spectrometer, the monochromators and the sample environments. The HIBEF user consortium has contributed a second experimental chamber with diamond anvil cells as well as special laser systems and a laser shock device.

=== Single Particles, Clusters, and Biomolecules & Serial Femtosecond Crystallography (SPB/SFX) ===
The instrument Single Particles, Clusters, and Biomolecules & Serial Femtosecond Crystallography (SPB/SFX) can provide data on objects in the micrometre range up to atomic resolution.

=== Spectroscopy and Coherent Scattering (SCS) ===
SCS is the soft X-rays spectroscopy and scattering instrument of the European XFEL. The scientific interest of SCS is focused on the exploration of light-induced transient phenomena in quantum materials as well as in molecules. The beamline hosts a soft X-rays grating monochromator for monochromatic operations.

The instrument is equipped with three main end-stations that can be coupled to different experimental probes:

- Chemistry chamber (CHEM) equipped with a liquid jet apparatus to study diluted samples, molecules and chemicals.
- Forward-scattering Fixed-Target (FFT): a solid samples chamber equipped with an electromagnet, optimized for transmission spectroscopies, small angle X-ray scattering (SAXS), coherent diffraction imaging (CDI) and X-ray photon correlation spectroscopy (XPCS).
- X-ray diffraction (XRD) chamber for solid samples equipped with a six degrees of freedom in-vacuum diffractometer.

The CHEM and XRD chambers can be couple with a high-resolution resonant inelastic X-ray scattering spectrometer to perform pump and probe RIXS experiments with a very high energy and temporal resolution.

The FFT and CHEM chambers can be both coupled to a forward scattering DEPMOS Sensor with Signal Compression (DSSC) detector.

SCS offers a variety of different optical sources to be used as a pump to induce transient states or photoactivated reactions in the samples. All the end-stations are equipped with an optical laser in-coupling which allows for spatial and temporal overlap of the X-rays and optical laser pulses at the interaction point.

=== Small Quantum Systems (SQS) ===
The SQS instrument is developed to investigate fundamental processes of light–matter interaction in the soft X-ray wavelength radiation. Typical objects of investigation are in the range from isolated atoms to large bio-molecules, and typical methods are variety of spectroscopic techniques. The SQS instrument provides three experimental stations:

- Atomic-like Quantum Systems (AQS) for atoms and small molecules
- Nano-size Quantum Systems (NQS) for clusters and nano-particles
- Reaction Microscope (SQS-REMI) enabling the complete characterization of the ionization and fragmentation process by analyzing all products created in the interaction of the target with the FEL pulses

Photon energy range between 260 eV and 3000 eV (4.8 nm to 0.4 nm). The ultrashort FEL pulses of less than 50 fs duration in combination with a synchronized optical laser allow for capturing ultrafast nuclear dynamics with very high resolution.

=== Materials imaging and dynamics (MID) ===
The scope of the MID instrument are material science experiments using the unprecedented coherent properties of the X-ray laser beams of the European XFEL. The scientific applications reach from condensed matter physics, studying for example glass formation and magnetism, through imaging of ultrafast hydrodynamic processes, to soft and biological material, such as colloids, cells and viruses.

Imaging

Imaging covers a broad range of techniques and scientific fields, from classical phase-contrast X-ray imaging to coherent X-ray diffraction imaging (CXDI) and with applications, e.g. in strain imaging inside nanostructured materials to bio-imaging of whole cells. In many cases the aim is to obtain a 3D representation of the investigated structure. By phase retrieval methods it is possible to pass from the measured diffraction patterns in reciprocal space to a real space visualization of the scattering object.

Dynamics

Complex nanoscale dynamics is an ubiquitous phenomenon of fundamental interest at the forefront of condensed matter science, and comprises a multitude of processes from visco-elastic flow or dissipation in liquids and glasses to polymer dynamics, protein folding, crystalline phase transitions, ultrafast spin transitions, domain wall dynamics, magnetic domain switching and many more. The extremely brilliant and highly coherent X-ray beams will open up unseen possibilities to study dynamics in disordered systems down to atomic length scales, with timescales ranging from femtoseconds to seconds using techniques such as XPCS.

== Control ==
The experiments in the facility are controlled via the in-house developed control system named Karabo. It is a distributed SCADA system written in C++ and python.

== Research ==
The short laser pulses make it possible to measure chemical reactions that are too rapid to be captured by other methods. The wavelength of the X-ray laser may be varied from 0.05 to 4.7 nm, enabling measurements at the atomic length scale.

Today, three photon beamlines with seven instruments can be used. Later this will be upgraded to five photon beamlines and a total of ten experimental stations.

The experimental beamlines enable unique scientific experiments using the high intensity, coherence and time structure of the new source to be conducted in a variety of disciplines spanning physics, chemistry, materials science, biology and nanotechnology.

== History ==
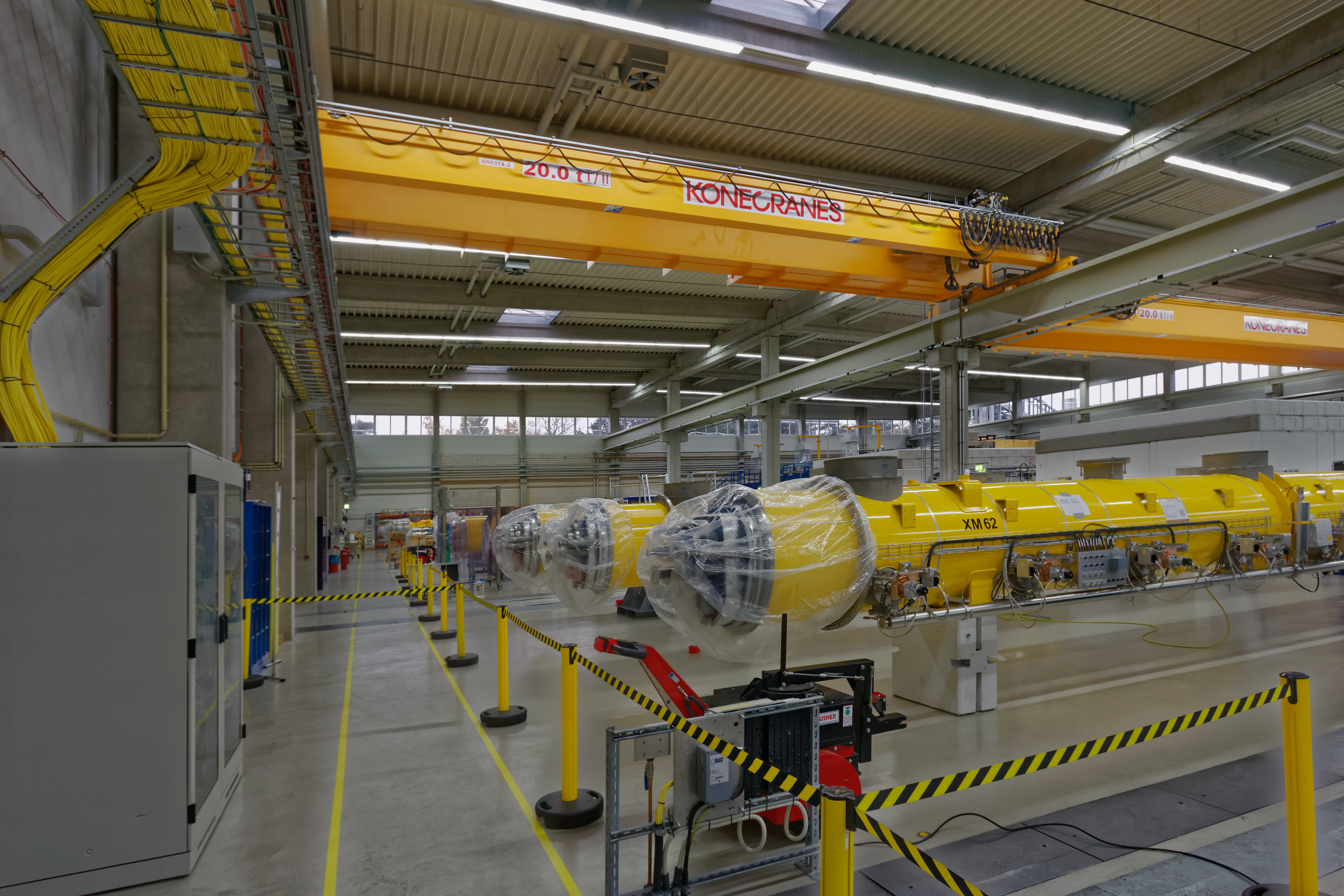
Accelerator modules during construction in 2015

The German Federal Ministry of Education and Research granted permission to build the facility on 5 June 2007 at a cost of €850 million, under the provision that it should be financed as a European project.

The European XFEL GmbH that built and operates the facility was founded in 2009. Civil construction of the facility began on 8 January 2009. Construction of the tunnels was completed in summer 2012, and all underground construction was completed the following year.

It was commissioned during 2017. The first beams were accelerated in April, and the first X-ray beams were produced in May 2017. XFEL was inaugurated in September. The overall cost for the construction and commissioning of the facility is as of 2017 estimated at €1.22 billion (price levels of 2005).
