= Distributed control system =

Computerized control system with distributed decision-making

A distributed control system (DCS) is a control system used to control industrial processes in which control functions are distributed among multiple autonomous controllers like Programmable Logic Controller (PLC) connected by a communication network. These controllers are typically located near the process equipment or within plant control areas, while operator interfaces, supervisory control, alarm management, and process monitoring are commonly provided through centralised operator stations. This architecture contrasts with centralised control systems, in which control functions are performed primarily by a central controller or computer system. By distributing control functions across multiple controllers, a DCS can improve system availability, scalability, and fault isolation, while reducing the amount of dedicated point-to-point wiring required for large industrial processes.

DCS first emerged in large, high value, safety critical process industries, and were attractive because the DCS manufacturer would supply both the local control level and central supervisory equipment as an integrated package, thus reducing design integration risk. Today the functionality of supervisory control and data acquisition (SCADA) and DCS systems are very similar, but DCS tends to be used on large continuous process plants where high reliability and security is important, and the control room is not necessarily geographically remote. Many machine control systems exhibit similar properties as plant and process control systems do.

== Structure ==
Functional levels of a manufacturing control operation

The key attribute of a DCS is its reliability due to the distribution of the control processing around nodes in the system. This mitigates a single processor failure. If a processor fails, it will only affect one section of the plant process, as opposed to a failure of a central computer which would affect the whole process. This distribution of computing power local to the field Input/Output (I/O) connection racks also ensures fast controller processing times by removing possible network and central processing delays.

The accompanying diagram is a general model which shows functional manufacturing levels using computerised control.

Referring to the diagram;

- Level 0 contains the field devices such as flow and temperature sensors, and final control elements, such as control valves
- Level 1 contains the industrialised Input/Output (I/O) modules, and their associated distributed electronic processors.
- Level 2 contains the supervisory computers, which collect information from processor nodes on the system, and provide the operator control screens.
- Level 3 is the production control level, which does not directly control the process, but is concerned with monitoring production and monitoring targets
- Level 4 is the production scheduling level.

Levels 1 and 2 are the functional levels of a traditional DCS, in which all equipment are part of an integrated system from a single manufacturer.

Levels 3 and 4 are not strictly process control in the traditional sense, but where production control and scheduling takes place.

=== Technical points ===
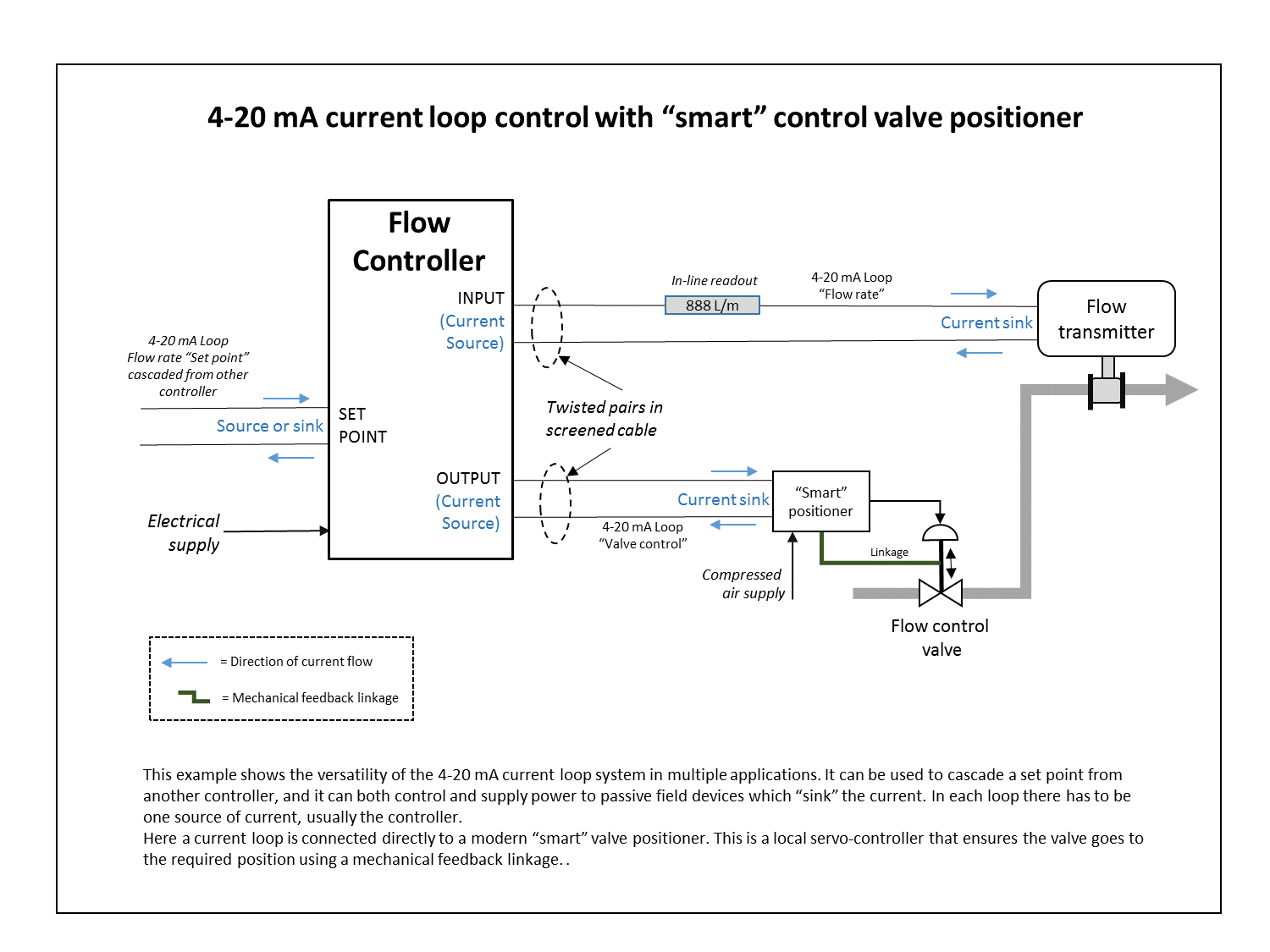
Example of a continuous flow control loop. Signalling is by industry-standard 4–20 mA current loops, and a "smart" valve positioner ensures that the control valve operates correctly.

The processor nodes and operator graphical user interfaces are connected over proprietary or industry-standard networks. Network reliability can be increased through redundant communication networks and diverse cable routes. This distributed topology can also reduce the amount of field cabling required by locating I/O modules and associated controllers closer to the process equipment.

The controllers receive information from input modules, process the information, and determine control actions that are transmitted through output modules. Field inputs and outputs can be analog signals, such as 4–20 mA DC current loops, or discrete signals that represent two states, such as "on" and "off". Discrete signals may be transmitted through relay contacts or semiconductor switching devices.

DCSs are connected to sensors and actuators and use setpoints and control algorithms to regulate industrial processes. A typical application is a PID controller that receives feedback from a flow meter and controls a control valve as the final control element. The controller compares the measured process variable with the required setpoint and adjusts the control valve to reduce the difference between them.

Large oil refineries and chemical plants can have several thousand I/O points and employ large DCSs. DCSs are also used in a wide range of other industrial processes, including paper machines and their associated quality-control systems, variable-speed drives, motor control centers, cement kilns, mining operations, and ore-processing facilities.

In high-reliability applications, DCSs may use redundant controllers, processors, communication networks, power supplies, and other system components. Redundant processors can be configured to support automatic failover, in which a standby processor assumes control if the primary processor fails. Some systems may also support manual switchover for maintenance or testing.

Although 4–20 mA signalling has historically been a widely used field signalling standard, modern DCSs also support digital communication protocols and networks, including fieldbus protocols such as Foundation Fieldbus and PROFIBUS, as well as protocols such as HART and Modbus.

Modern DCSs may also support advanced control techniques, including neural networks and fuzzy logic. Research in distributed control also includes the design of distributed controllers for spatially interconnected systems and the optimization of control performance according to criteria such as H-infinity and H_{2} control criteria.

=== Signal flow and termination ===
In a typical DCS installation, signals from field instruments are connected to termination assemblies or marshalling cabinets before being routed to the system's I/O modules. A typical measurement signal may therefore follow the path:

Field instrument → field junction box → marshalling cabinet → I/O module → controller → control network → operator station

For an output signal, the flow is generally reversed:

Operator station or control algorithm → controller → I/O module → marshalling or termination assembly → field device

For example, a flow transmitter may measure the flow rate of a process stream and transmit the measurement as a 4–20 mA signal. The signal is routed through field wiring and termination equipment to an analog input module. The DCS controller then processes the measurement and compares it with the configured setpoint. A control algorithm, such as a PID controller, calculates the required output and sends a signal through an analog output module to a control-valve positioner. The positioner adjusts the valve to regulate the process flow.

Termination and marshalling equipment provides the physical interface between field wiring and the DCS I/O system. It may include terminal blocks, signal-conditioning devices, fuses, isolators, surge-protection devices, and other interface components. In conventional installations, each field signal is individually wired to a termination point and then connected to the appropriate I/O channel. Modern systems may use remote I/O, electronic marshalling, or digital communication networks to reduce conventional point-to-point wiring and allow I/O channels to be assigned more flexibly.

DCS installations commonly separate field wiring, termination equipment, I/O modules, controllers, and operator networks into different functional layers. The exact arrangement varies between systems and manufacturers. Redundant architectures may provide separate power supplies, communication paths, controllers, or I/O components to maintain operation following the failure of a system component.

== Typical applications ==
Distributed control systems (DCSs) are used primarily in large-scale industrial processes that are continuous, batch-oriented, or involve multiple interconnected process operations.

Processes and industries in which DCSs may be used include:

- Chemical plants
- Petrochemical plants, oil refineries, Oil platforms, FPSO vessels, and LNG plants
- Pulp and paper mills, including associated quality control systems
- Power plants, including boiler, turbine, and balance-of-plant control systems
- Nuclear power plants
- Hydroelectric, thermal, and combined-cycle power plants
- Water treatment and water supply systems
- Sewage treatment plants
- Environmental control systems
- Food processing and beverage manufacturing
- Agrochemical and fertiliser production
- Pharmaceutical manufacturing
- Sugar refining and other food-processing industries
- Mining and mineral-processing operations
- Metallurgical and steel mill process plants
- Cement manufacturing and cement kilns
- Glass manufacturing and other process industries
- Automobile manufacturing and other large-scale manufacturing processes
- Agriculture and greenhouse automation
- District heating and other large-scale utility systems
- Desalination plants
- Oil and gas gathering, processing, and transportation facilities
- Renewable energy facilities and associated energy-storage systems

== History ==
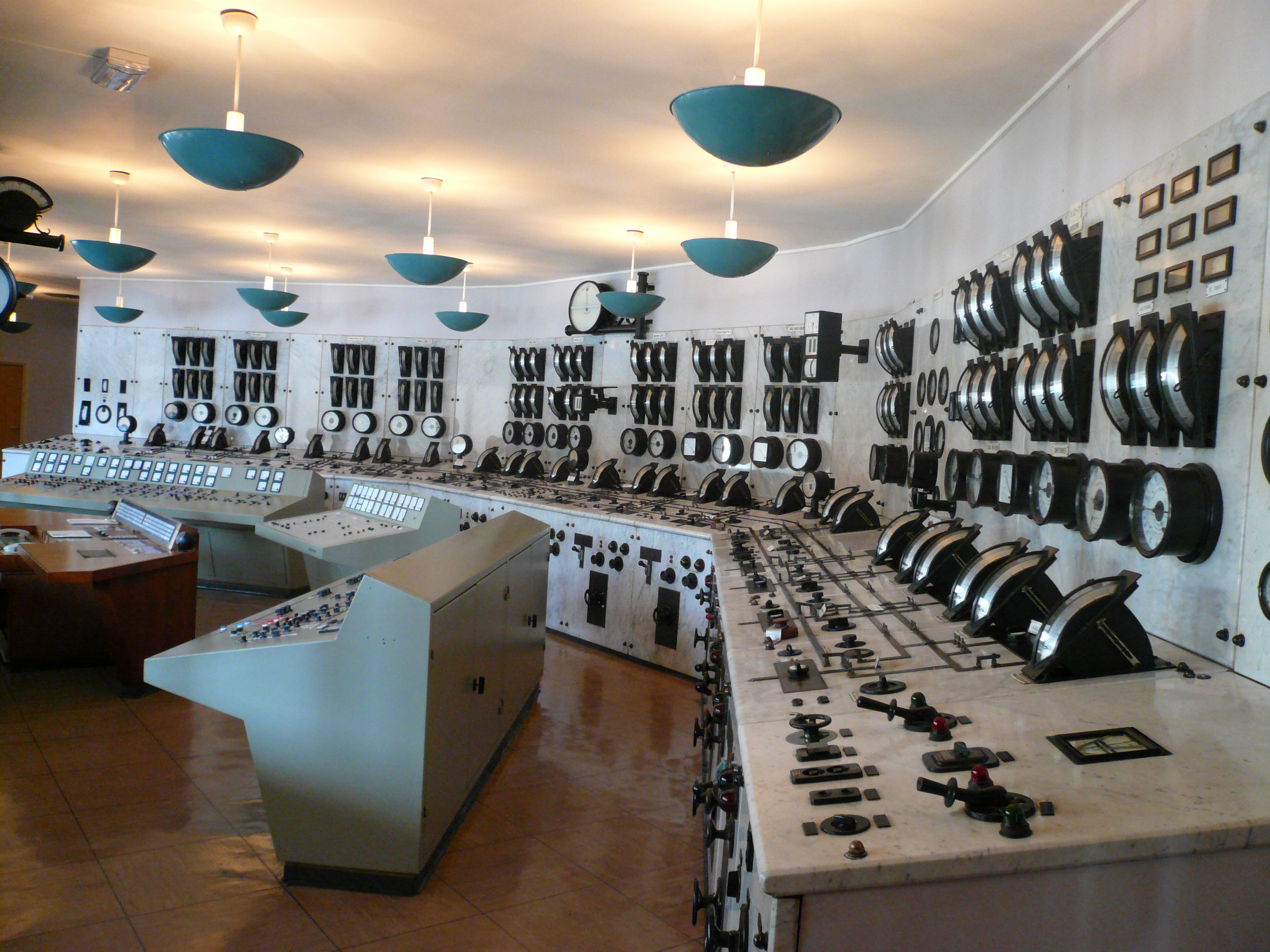
A pre-DCS era central control room. Whilst the controls are centralised in one place, they are still discrete and not integrated into one system.

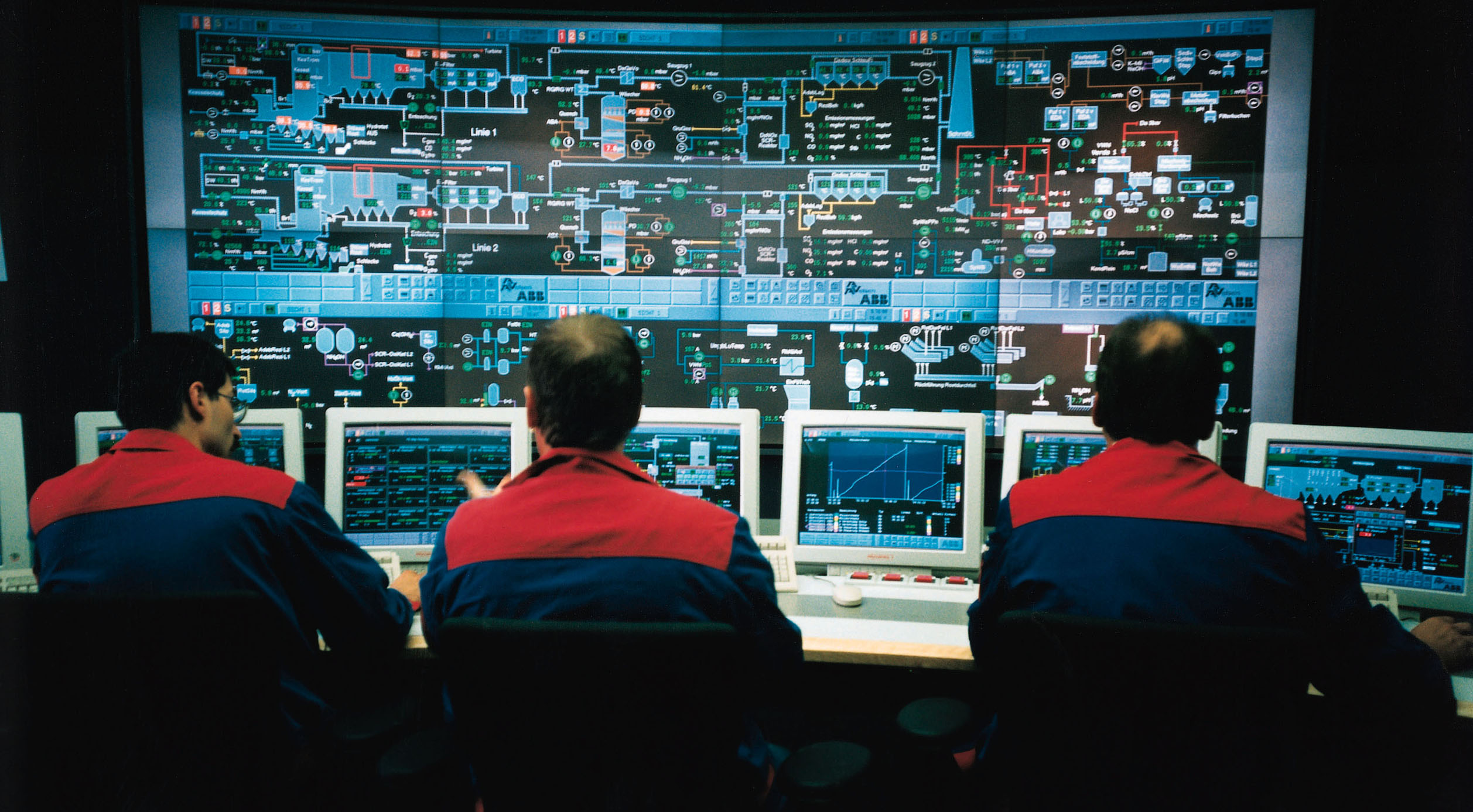
A DCS control room where plant information and controls are displayed on computer graphics screens. The operators are seated as they can view and control any part of the process from their screens, whilst retaining a plant overview.

=== Evolution of process control operations ===
Process control of large industrial plants has evolved through many stages. Initially, control would be from panels local to the process plant. However this required a large amount of human oversight to attend to these dispersed panels, and there was no overall view of the process. The next logical development was the transmission of all plant measurements to a permanently-staffed central control room. Effectively this was the centralisation of all the localised panels, with the advantages of lower manning levels and easier overview of the process. Often the controllers were behind the control room panels, and all automatic and manual control outputs were transmitted back to plant. However, whilst providing a central control focus, this arrangement was inflexible as each control loop had its own controller hardware, and continual operator movement within the control room was required to view different parts of the process.

With the coming of electronic processors and graphic displays it became possible to replace these discrete controllers with computer-based algorithms, hosted on a network of input/output racks with their own control processors. These could be distributed around plant, and communicate with the graphic display in the control room or rooms. The distributed control system was born.

The introduction of DCSs allowed easy interconnection and re-configuration of plant controls such as cascaded loops and interlocks, and easy interfacing with other production computer systems. It enabled sophisticated alarm handling, introduced automatic event logging, removed the need for physical records such as chart recorders, allowed the control racks to be networked and thereby located locally to plant to reduce cabling runs, and provided high level overviews of plant status and production levels.

=== Origins ===
Early minicomputers were used in the control of industrial processes since the beginning of the 1960s. The IBM 1800, for example, was an early computer that had input/output hardware to gather process signals in a plant for conversion from field contact levels (for digital points) and analog signals to the digital domain.

The first industrial control computer system was built 1959 at the Texaco Port Arthur, Texas, refinery with an RW-300 of the Ramo-Wooldridge Company.

In 1975, both HONEYWELL and Japanese electrical engineering firm Yokogawa introduced their own independently produced DCS's - TDC 2000 and CENTUM systems, respectively. US-based Bristol also introduced their UCS 3000 universal controller in 1975. In 1978 Valmet introduced their own DCS system called Damatic (latest web-based generation Valmet DNAe). In 1980, Bailey (now part of ABB) introduced the NETWORK 90 system, Fisher Controls (now part of Emerson Electric) introduced the PROVoX system, Fischer & Porter Company (now also part of ABB) introduced DCI-4000 (DCI stands for Distributed Control Instrumentation).

The DCS largely came about due to the increased availability of microcomputers and the proliferation of microprocessors in the world of process control. Computers had already been applied to process automation for some time in the form of both direct digital control (DDC) and setpoint control. In the early 1970s Taylor Instrument Company, (now part of ABB) developed the 1010 system, Foxboro the FOX1 system, Fisher Controls the DC^{2} system and Bailey Controls the 1055 systems. All of these were DDC applications implemented within minicomputers (DEC PDP-11, Varian Data Machines, MODCOMP etc.) and connected to proprietary Input/Output hardware. Sophisticated (for the time) continuous as well as batch control was implemented in this way. A more conservative approach was setpoint control, where process computers supervised clusters of analog process controllers. A workstation provided visibility into the process using text and crude character graphics. Availability of a fully functional graphical user interface was a way away.

=== Development ===
Central to the DCS model was the inclusion of control function blocks. Function blocks evolved from early, more primitive DDC concepts of "Table Driven" software. One of the first embodiments of object-oriented software, function blocks were self-contained "blocks" of code that emulated analog hardware control components and performed tasks that were essential to process control, such as execution of PID algorithms. Function blocks continue to endure as the predominant method of control for DCS suppliers, and are supported by key technologies such as Foundation Fieldbus today.

Midac Systems, of Sydney, Australia, developed an objected-oriented distributed direct digital control system in 1982. The central system ran 11 microprocessors sharing tasks and common memory and connected to a serial communication network of distributed controllers each running two Z80s. The system was installed at the University of Melbourne.

Digital communication between distributed controllers, workstations and other computing elements (peer to peer access) was one of the primary advantages of the DCS. Attention was duly focused on the networks, which provided the all-important lines of communication that, for process applications, had to incorporate specific functions such as determinism and redundancy. As a result, many suppliers embraced the IEEE 802.4 networking standard. This decision set the stage for the wave of migrations necessary when information technology moved into process automation and IEEE 802.3 rather than IEEE 802.4 prevailed as the control LAN.

=== The network-centric era of the 1980s ===
In the 1980s, users began to look at DCSs as more than just basic process control. A very early example of a Direct Digital Control DCS was completed by the Australian business Midac in 1981–82 using R-Tec Australian designed hardware. The system installed at the University of Melbourne used a serial communications network, connecting campus buildings back to a control room "front end". Each remote unit ran two Z80 microprocessors, while the front end ran eleven Z80s in a parallel processing configuration with paged common memory to share tasks and that could run up to 20,000 concurrent control objects.

It was believed that if openness could be achieved and greater amounts of data could be shared throughout the enterprise that even greater things could be achieved. The first attempts to increase the openness of DCSs resulted in the adoption of the predominant operating system of the day: UNIX. UNIX and its companion networking technology TCP-IP were developed by the US Department of Defense for openness, which was precisely the issue the process industries were looking to resolve.

As a result, suppliers also began to adopt Ethernet-based networks with their own proprietary protocol layers. The full TCP/IP standard was not implemented, but the use of Ethernet made it possible to implement the first instances of object management and global data access technology. The 1980s also witnessed the first PLCs integrated into the DCS infrastructure. Plant-wide historians also emerged to capitalize on the extended reach of automation systems. The first DCS supplier to adopt UNIX and Ethernet networking technologies was Foxboro, who introduced the I/A Series system in 1987.

=== The application-centric era of the 1990s ===
The drive toward openness in the 1980s gained momentum through the 1990s with the increased adoption of commercial off-the-shelf (COTS) components and IT standards. Probably the biggest transition undertaken during this time was the move from the UNIX operating system to the Windows environment. While the realm of the real time operating system (RTOS) for control applications remains dominated by real time commercial variants of UNIX or proprietary operating systems, everything above real-time control has made the transition to Windows.

The introduction of Microsoft at the desktop and server layers resulted in the development of technologies such as OLE for process control (OPC), which is now a de facto industry connectivity standard. Internet technology also began to make its mark in automation and the world, with most DCS HMI supporting Internet connectivity. The 1990s were also known for the "Fieldbus Wars", where rival organizations competed to define what would become the IEC fieldbus standard for digital communication with field instrumentation instead of 4–20 milliamp analog communications. The first fieldbus installations occurred in the 1990s. Towards the end of the decade, the technology began to develop significant momentum, with the market consolidated around Ethernet I/P, Foundation Fieldbus and Profibus PA for process automation applications. Some suppliers built new systems from the ground up to maximize functionality with fieldbus, such as Rockwell PlantPAx System, Honeywell with Experion & Plantscape SCADA systems, ABB with System 800xA, Emerson Process Management with the Emerson Process Management DeltaV control system, Siemens with the SPPA-T3000 or Simatic PCS 7, Forbes Marshall with the Microcon+ control system and Azbil Corporation with the Harmonas-DEO system. Fieldbus technics have been used to integrate machine, drives, quality and condition monitoring applications to one DCS with Valmet DNA system.

The impact of COTS, however, was most pronounced at the hardware layer. For years, the primary business of DCS suppliers had been the supply of large amounts of hardware, particularly I/O and controllers. The initial proliferation of DCSs required the installation of prodigious amounts of this hardware, most of it manufactured from the bottom up by DCS suppliers. Standard computer components from manufacturers such as Intel and Motorola, however, made it cost prohibitive for DCS suppliers to continue making their own components, workstations, and networking hardware.

As the suppliers made the transition to COTS components, they also discovered that the hardware market was shrinking fast. COTS not only resulted in lower manufacturing costs for the supplier, but also steadily decreasing prices for the end users, who were also becoming increasingly vocal over what they perceived to be unduly high hardware costs. Some suppliers that were previously stronger in the PLC business, such as Rockwell Automation and Siemens, were able to leverage their expertise in manufacturing control hardware to enter the DCS marketplace with cost effective offerings, while the stability/scalability/reliability and functionality of these emerging systems are still improving. The traditional DCS suppliers introduced new generation DCS System based on the latest Communication and IEC Standards, which resulting in a trend of combining the traditional concepts/functionalities for PLC and DCS into a one for all solution—named "Process Automation System" (PAS). The gaps among the various systems remain at the areas such as: the database integrity, pre-engineering functionality, system maturity, communication transparency and reliability. While it is expected the cost ratio is relatively the same (the more powerful the systems are, the more expensive they will be), the reality of the automation business is often operating strategically case by case. The current next evolution step is called Collaborative Process Automation Systems.

To compound the issue, suppliers were also realizing that the hardware market was becoming saturated. The life cycle of hardware components such as I/O and wiring is also typically in the range of 15 to over 20 years, making for a challenging replacement market. Many of the older systems that were installed in the 1970s and 1980s are still in use today, and there is a considerable installed base of systems in the market that are approaching the end of their useful life. Developed industrial economies in North America, Europe, and Japan already had many thousands of DCSs installed, and with few if any new plants being built, the market for new hardware was shifting rapidly to smaller, albeit faster growing regions such as China, Latin America, and Eastern Europe.

Because of the shrinking hardware business, suppliers began to make the challenging transition from a hardware-based business model to one based on software and value-added services. It is a transition that is still being made today. The applications portfolio offered by suppliers expanded considerably in the '90s to include areas such as production management, model-based control, real-time optimization, plant asset management (PAM), Real-time performance management (RPM) tools, alarm management, and many others. To obtain the true value from these applications, however, often requires a considerable service content, which the suppliers also provide.

=== Modern systems (2010 onwards) ===
The latest developments in DCS include the following new technologies:

1. Wireless systems and protocols
2. Remote transmission, logging and data historian
3. Mobile interfaces and controls
4. Embedded web-servers

Increasingly, and ironically, DCS are becoming centralised at plant level, with the ability to log into the remote equipment. This enables operator to control both at enterprise level ( macro ) and at the equipment level (micro), both within and outside the plant, because the importance of the physical location drops due to interconnectivity primarily thanks to wireless and remote access.

The more wireless protocols are developed and refined, the more they are included in DCS. DCS controllers are now often equipped with embedded servers and provide on-the-go web access. Whether DCS will lead Industrial Internet of Things (IIOT) or borrow key elements from remains to be seen.

Many vendors provide the option of a mobile HMI, ready for both Android and iOS. With these interfaces, the threat of security breaches and possible damage to plant and process are now very real.

== See also ==
- Annunciator panel
- Building automation
- EPICS
- Industrial control system
- Plant process and emergency shutdown systems
- Safety instrumented system (SIS)
- TANGO
