= IThemba LABS =

South African laboratory for accelerator-based sciences

iThemba Laboratory for Accelerator Based Sciences
- Established: National Accelerator Centre - 1966; 60 years ago
- Headquarters: Western Cape
- Coordinates: 34.025°S 18.716°E
- Director: Dr. Makondelele Victor Tshivhase
- Parent organisation: National Research Foundation
- Website: tlabs.ac.za

iThemba Laboratory for Accelerator Based Sciences (or iThemba LABS; Xhosa: iThemba, lit. 'Hope') is a scientific research centre with plants at Faure near Cape Town and on the Wits Campus in Johannesburg.

The organisation has in the past been known as the National Accelerator Centre, and specialises in the use of particle accelerators. The main research fields involve the production of medical radioisotopes for the treatment of cancer, material sciences, nuclear fission experiments, development of new accelerator technology and the real-time treatment of cancer patients through proton and neutron therapy.

The mass spectrometry unit was opened by South Africa's Science and Technology Minister Naledi Pandor in 2014. In 2018 a conference was held to mark ten years of a collaboration programme with CERN.

The main plant near Cape Town houses a number of accelerators that are used for various research purposes. Materials and biological studies are mainly served by a Van der Graaff accelerator, while nuclear physics research and radioisotope production make use of a number of cyclotrons. The main cyclotron, is a K = 200 open sector cyclotron (OSS) and is fed by two pre-accelerators. The OSS is designed to produce protons at 200MeV. The preamplifiers are solid pole cyclotrons (SPS) and produce 8MeV proton beams.
