= Karabo Mathang-Tshabuse =

South African soccer agent and attorney

- Born: 1987 or 1988 (age 38–39); Orlando East, Soweto, South Africa
- Occupations: Soccer agent and lawyer
- Years active: 2007–present

Karabo Mathang-Tshabuse (born 1987 or 1988) is a lawyer and soccer agent. In 2009, she became the first South African female FIFA-accredited soccer agent. In 2007, she was a founder of the sports management company Pmanagement.

== Personal life ==
Mathang-Tshabuse was born in Orlando East, Soweto, South Africa. Her father works in economic development for the city of Johannesburg. Growing up, Mathang-Tshabuse lived three houses away from Jomo Sono. She attended her first soccer match at the age of 5, and frequently attended soccer matches with her now-husband Josy and Nonhlanhla Nkosi, who later became marketing manager for Kaizer Chiefs. Mathang-Tshabuse decided to give up playing soccer during high school. Mathang-Tshabuse has a bachelor's degree in media and international relations from the University of the Witwatersrand (Wits), and in 2014, she began a law degree at Wits. Mathang-Tshabuse has two children. She is now a Practicing Attorney of the High Court of South Africa.

== Career ==
In 2007, Mathang opened her sports management company Pmanagement with her now husband Josy and Nonhlanhla Nkosi, marketing manager of Kaizer Chiefs. The company was set up to scout amateur soccer players for those who had talent to play professionally. Her company has scouted players including Amanda Dlamini, Tendai Ndoro, and Ronald Kampamba. Nkosi left Pmanagement in 2012.

Whilst applying to be a professional soccer agent, she had to pay R1 million of indemnity insurance to the South African Football Association (SAFA), using money that her company had made. In 2009, at the age of 21, Mathang became South Africa's first female soccer agent to be accredited by FIFA and SAFA. She had previously failed the soccer agent's examination twice. In 2015, Mathang-Tshabuse set up the Association of Accredited Agents, in order to try and solve the issue of unlicensed soccer agents in South African football. As a soccer agent, Mathang-Tshabuse has represented Justin Shonga, and has also worked with Thembinkosi Lorch.

In 2013, Mathang-Tshabuse was listed in the Mail&Guardian young South Africans (2013). In 2015, Mathang-Tshabuse was included on the BBC's 100 Women list. In 2016, She was awarded Glamour Women of the Year Award - Business Category. Mathang-Tshabuse was involved in a court case over points deductions that determined the outcome of the 2020–21 National First Division. She was the lawyer for Sekhukhune United, who were successfully awarded three points, and won the league as a result.
