= X-ray photon correlation spectroscopy =

Analytical technique

X-ray photon correlation spectroscopy (XPCS) in physics and chemistry, is a novel technique that exploits a coherent X-ray synchrotron beam to measure the dynamics of a sample.

XPCS is generally used in order to measure density fluctuation in materials.

By recording how a coherent speckle pattern fluctuates in time, one can measure a time correlation function, and thus measure the timescale processes of interest (diffusion, relaxation, reorganization, etc.). XPCS is used to study the slow dynamics of various equilibrium and non-equilibrium processes occurring in condensed matter systems.

XPCS can be used to study a wide range of matter and materials.

== Advantages ==
XPCS experiments have the advantage of providing information of dynamical properties of materials (e.g. vitreous materials), while other experimental techniques can only provide information about the static structure of the material. This technique is based on the generation of a speckle pattern by the scattered coherent light originating from a material where some spatial inhomogeneities are present. A speckle pattern is a diffraction limited structure factor, and is typically observed when laser light is reflected from a rough surface, or from dust particles performing Brownian motion in air. The observation of speckle patterns with hard X-rays has just been demonstrated in the last few years. This observation is only possible now because of the development of new synchrotron radiation X-ray sources that can provide sufficient coherent flux.

== aXPCS ==
A specific subgroup of these techniques is atomic-scale X-ray photon correlation spectroscopy (aXPCS).

== Sources ==
- P.-A. Lemieux, D.J. Durian Investigating non-Gaussian scattering processes by using nth-order intensity correlation functions Journal of the Optical Society of America 1999, 16(7), 1651–1664. doi: 10.1364/JOSAA.16.001651
- Robert L. Leheny XPCS: Nanoscale motion and rheology Current Opinion in Colloid & Interface Science 2012, 17 (1), 3–12. doi: 10.1016/j.cocis.2011.11.002
- Oleg G. Shpyrko X-ray photon correlation spectroscopy J. Synchrotron Radiation 2014, 21 (5), 1057–1064. doi: 10.1107/S1600577514018232
- Sunil K. Sinha, Zhang Jiang, Laurence B. Lurio X-ray Photon Correlation Spectroscopy Studies of Surfaces and Thin Films Advanced Materials 2014, 26 (46), 7764–7785. doi: 10.1002/adma.201401094
- Aurora Nogales, Andrei Fluerasu X Ray Photon Correlation Spectroscopy for the study of polymer dynamics European Polymer Journal 2016. doi: 10.1016/j.eurpolymj.2016.03.032
