= Remote data transmission =

Transmission of data between computers over a medium

Remote data transmission (RDT) was a term used in the 1980s, primarily in Germany, for the transmission of data between computers over a medium using a communications protocol. At the time, the most widespread form was RDT over the telephone network. Other transmission media like radio waves or light were also used. Most RDT now uses the Internet.

In German speaking areas, RDT is used in the special sense of the considerably more narrowly defined Electronic Data Interchange (EDI).

Systems for remote administration of facilities and remote control adjustments may use remote data transmission standards.

To be transmittable, data must be appropriately prepared for the medium. For this, special hardware, e.g., a modem or an ISDN card is necessary.

== History ==
When remote data transmission began, data were exchanged by the use of diskettes, magnetic tape, punched tape and dispatched via courier (the so-called sneaker net).

In the beginning, electronic remote data transmission was also accomplished through special adapters on special data or telex lines, teleprinter, serial ports, and analog telephone] or over simple radio connections.

Acoustic couplers that could be attached to a normal telephone handset, and later modems, were used.

RDT achieved great significance for private users at the end of the 1980s with the arrival of local and global bulletin board systems like FidoNet and CompuServe. Many of these systems later had internet access via computer gateways, but they were mostly discontinued by the end of the 1990s with the internet rise to dominance.

Communication between PCs through the internet is also a form of remote data transmission.

== Methods and transmission standards ==
- Wireless LAN
- RS-232
- V.90
- ISDN
- DSL with the variations ADSL, ADSL2+, SDSL and VDSL
- Ethernet
- Bluetooth
- GSM with the extensions HSCSD, GPRS and EDGE
- UMTS with the extension HSDPA
- IrDA

== See also ==
- start bit
- stop bit
- parity bit
- baudrate
- flow control
- data rate
- Hayes command set
- electronic banking
