= Mashhad =

City in Razavi Khorasan province, Iran

Mashhad مشهد (Persian) Mashad, Meshhed, Meshed, Sanabad
- City
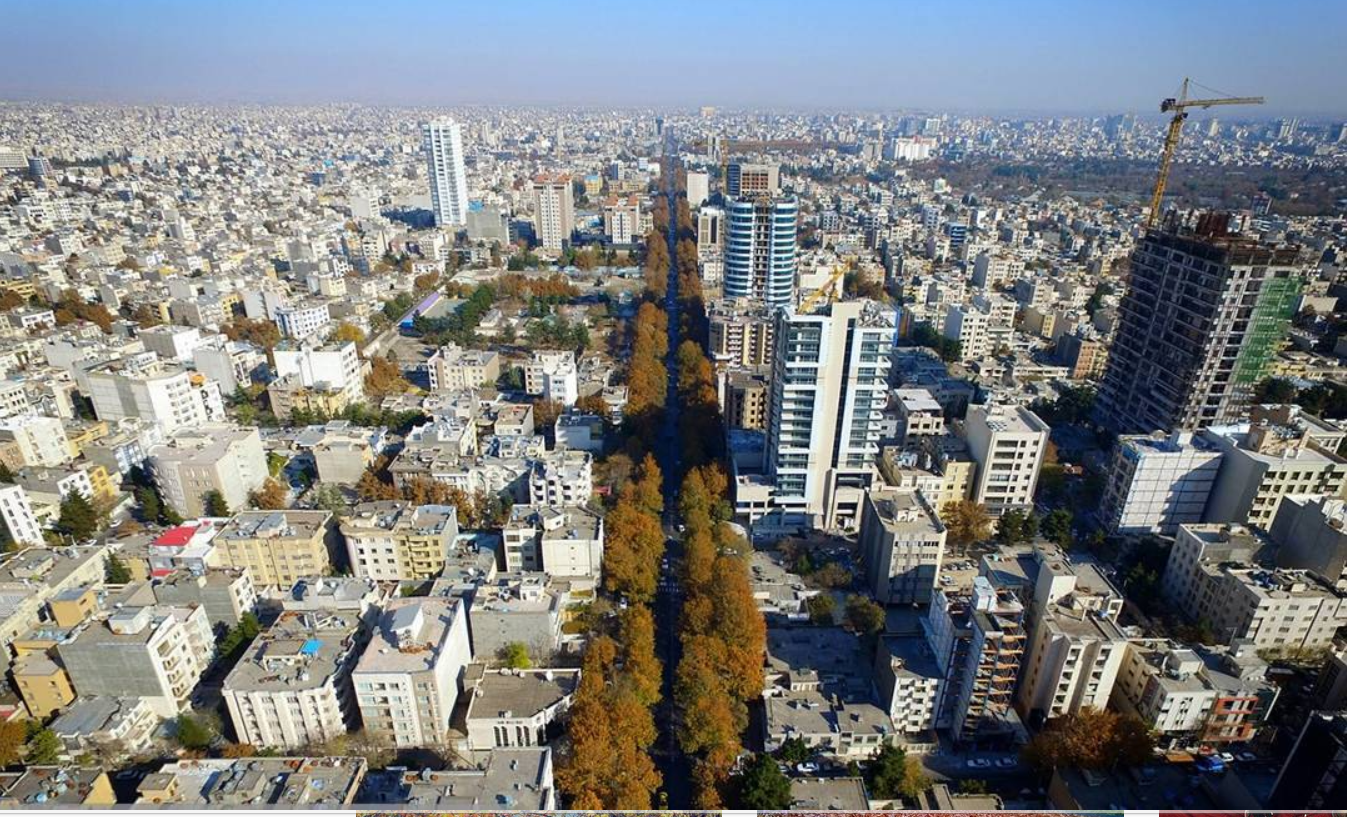
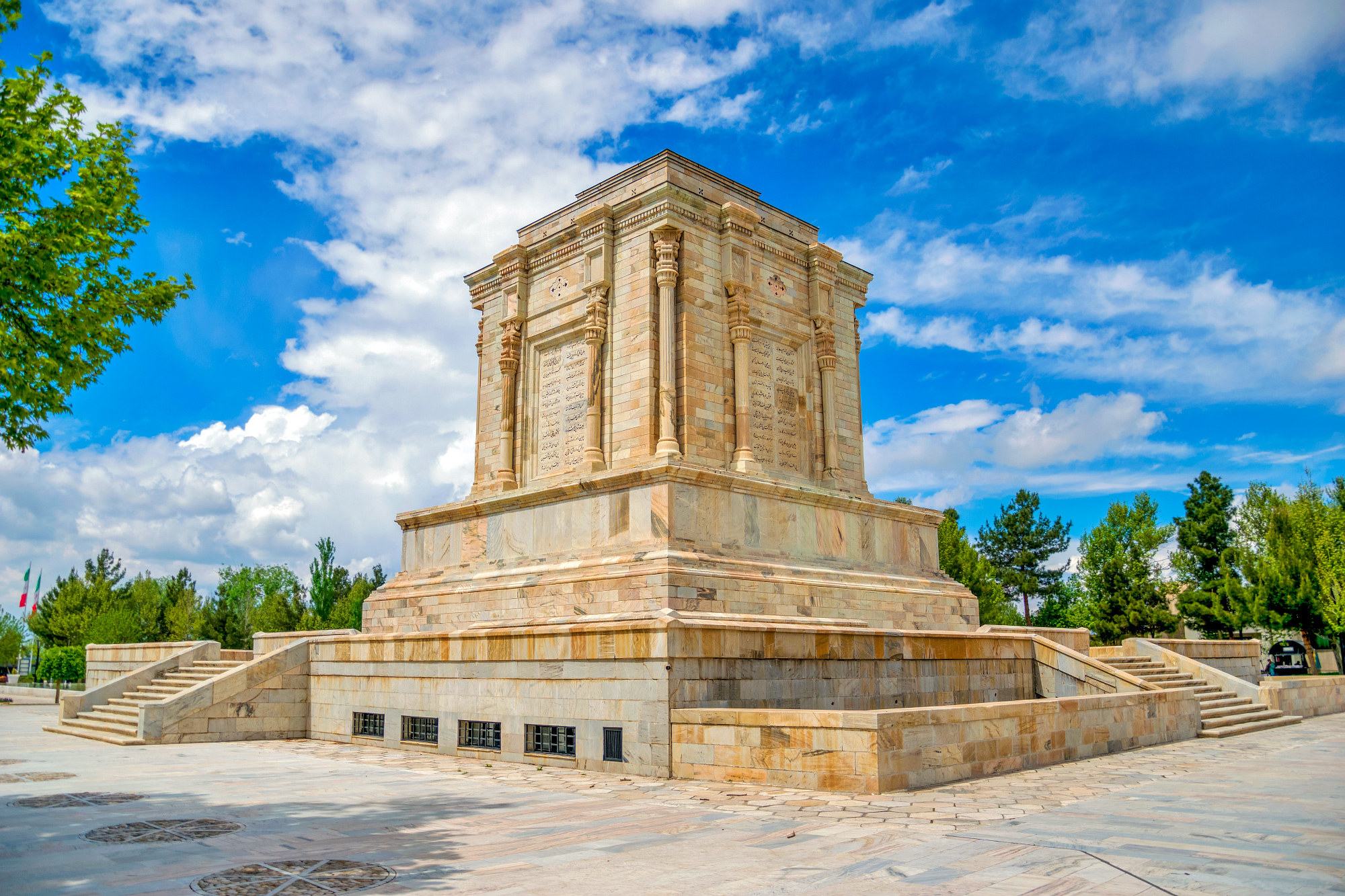
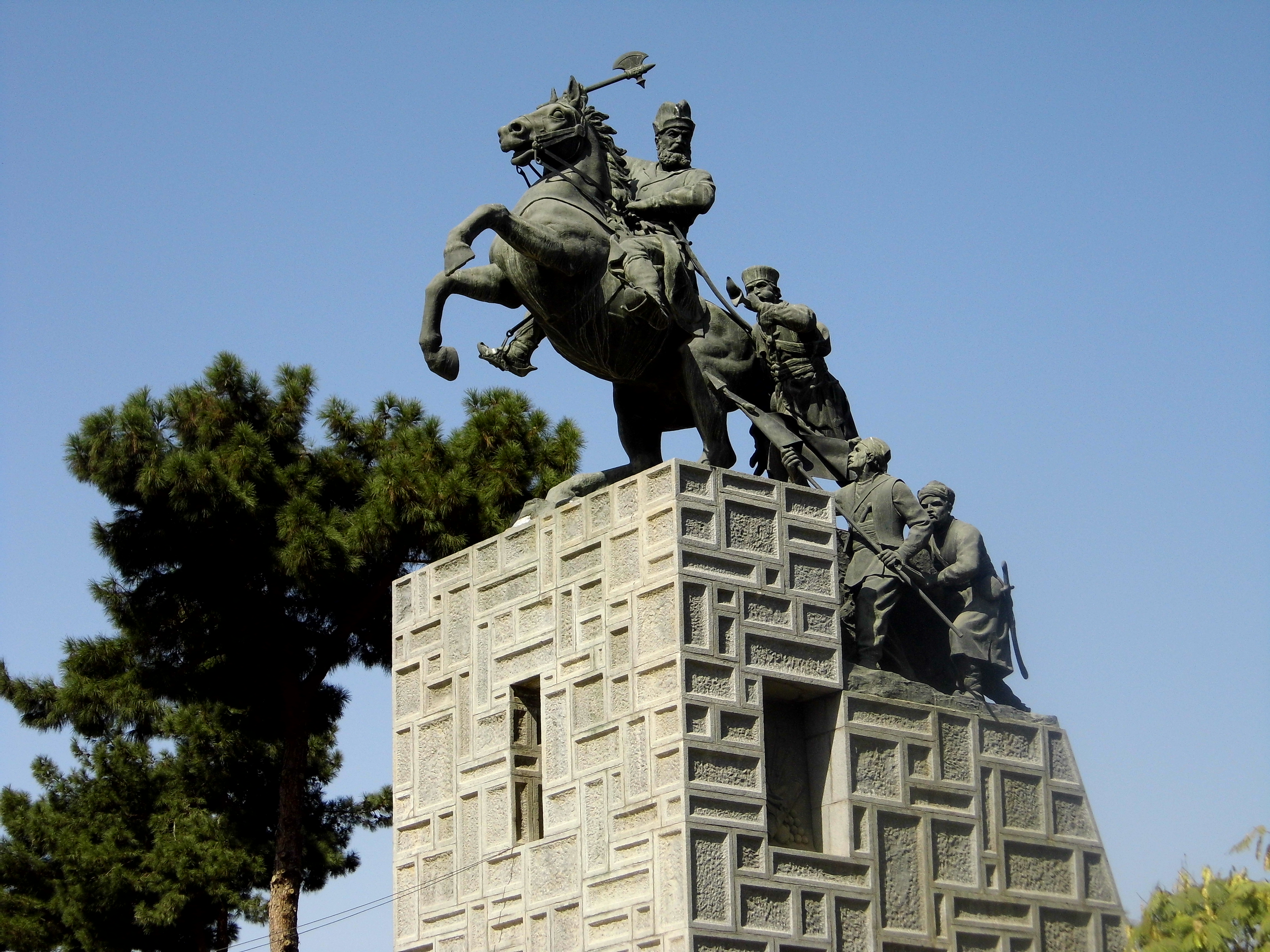
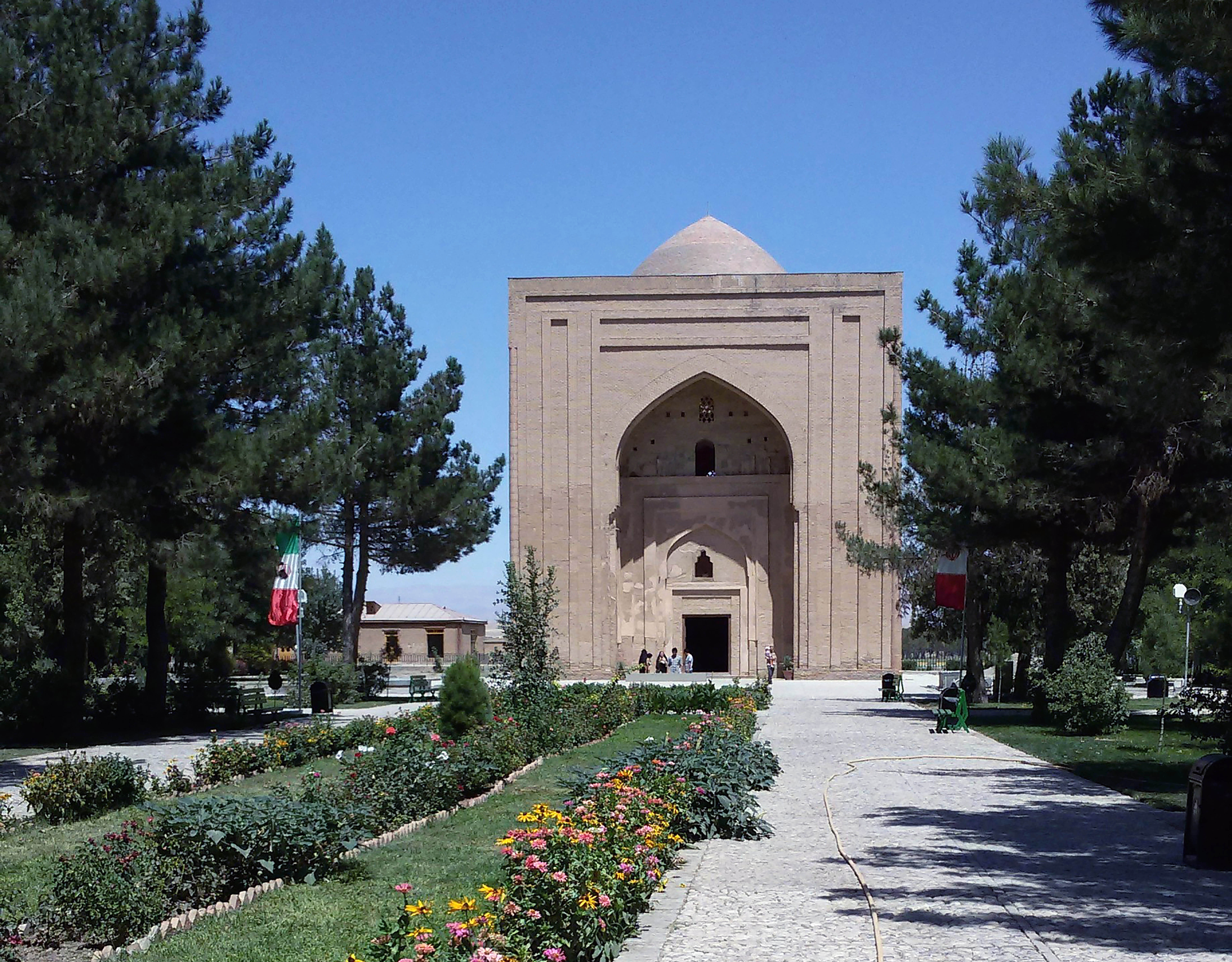
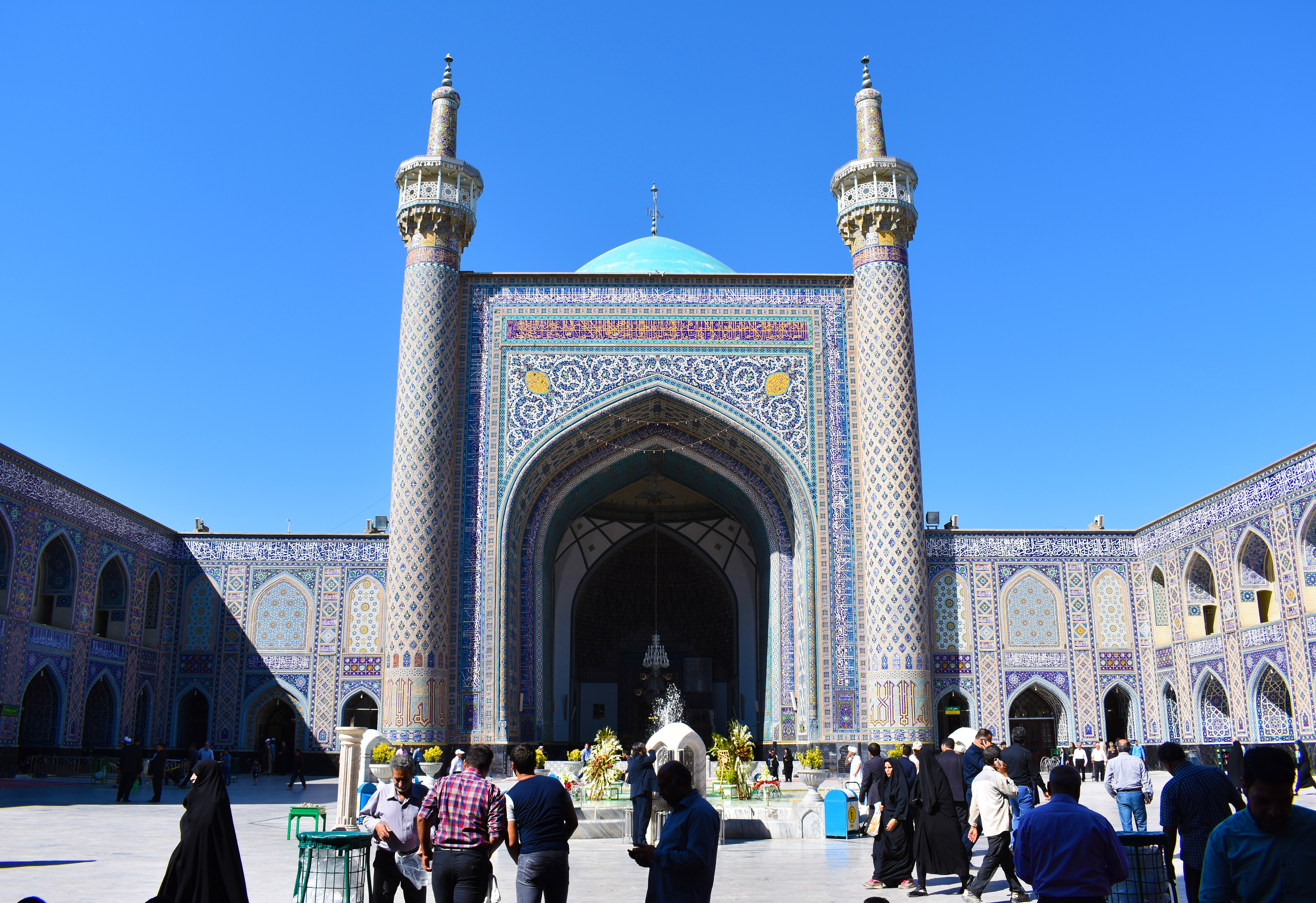
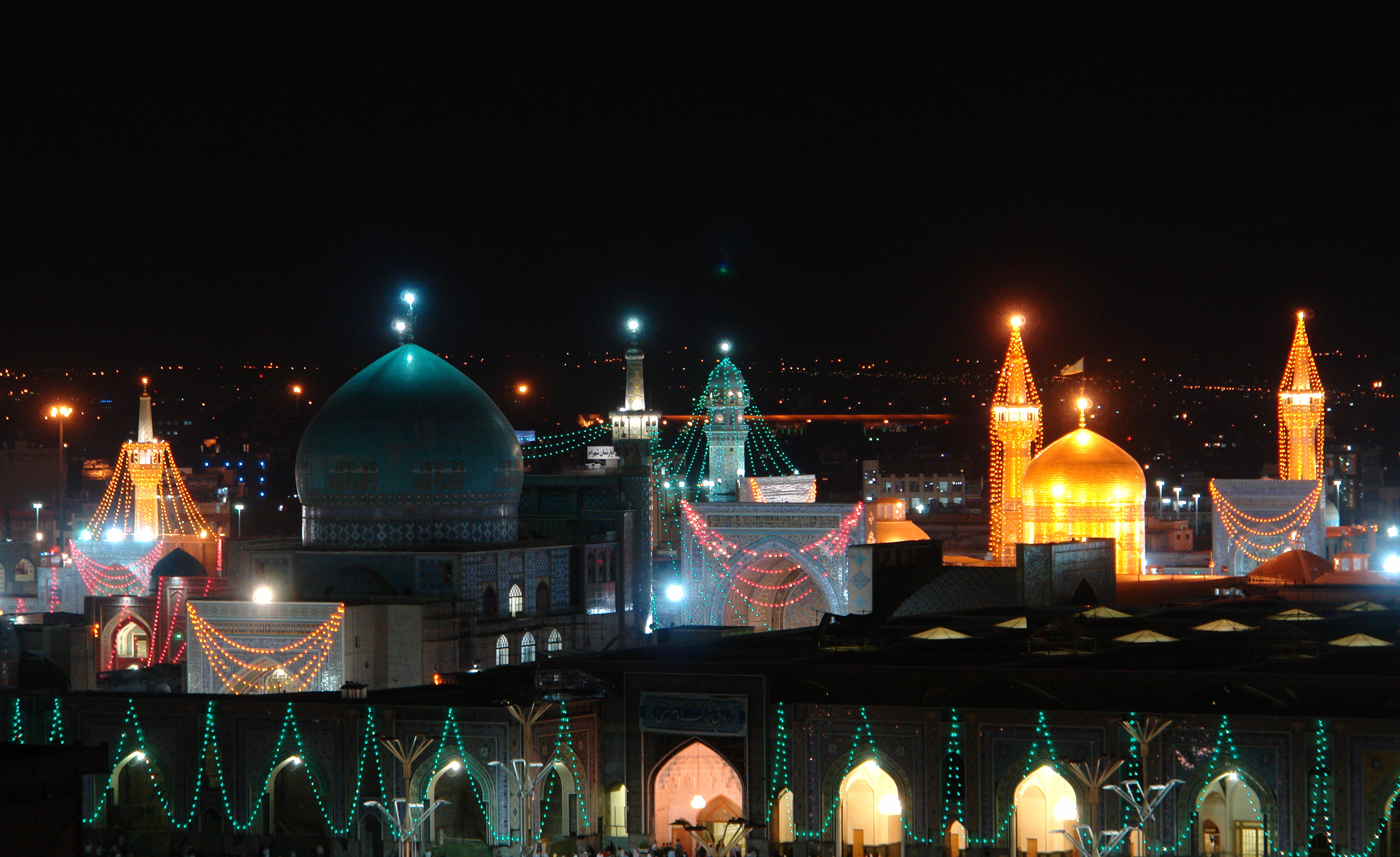
- Kuhsangi Street Tomb of Ferdowsi Tomb of Nader Shah Haruniyeh Dome Goharshad Mosque Imam Reza Shrine

- Seal
- Motto(s): Mashhad: Smart City, City of Hope and Life
- Map of Mashhad
- Location in Iran
- Coordinates: 36°19′35″N 59°32′36″E
- Country: Iran
- Province: Razavi Khorasan
- County: Mashhad
- District: Central
- Mashhad-Sanabad-Tus: 818 AD

Government
  - Mayor: Mohammad Reza Ghalandar Sharif
  - Chairperson of City Council: Hassan Movahedian

Area
  - City: 351 km^{2} (136 sq mi)
- Elevation: 995 m (3,264 ft)

Population (2016)
  - City: 3,001,184
  - Rank: 2nd in Iran
  - Density: 6,500/km^{2} (17,000/sq mi)
  - Urban: 3,317,381
  - Metro: 4,543,000 </ref>
- Over 2.5 million pilgrims and tourists per year
- Demonym(s): Mashhadi, Mashadi, Mashdi (informal)

GDP (Nominal, 2024)
  - City: US$24.9 billion
  - Per capita: US$7,300
- Time zone: UTC+03:30 (IRST)
- Climate: BSk
- Largest district by area: District 9 (64 km^{2}, land area)
- Largest district by population: District 2 (480,000)
- Website: www.mashhad.ir

Mashhad (Persian: مشهد [mæʃˈhæd]), historically also known as Mashad (/məˈʃæd/ mə-SHAD), Meshhed, or Meshed, is the second-most-populous city in Iran, located in the north-east of the country about 740 kilometres (460 miles) east of Tehran. In the Central District of Mashhad County, it serves as the capital of Razavi Khorasan province, the county, and the district. It has a population of about 3,400,000 (2016 census), which includes the areas of Mashhad Taman and Torqabeh.

Mashhad has been governed by different ethnic groups. A small village, by the 9th century it was known as Sanabad and was located—along with Tus and other villages—on the ancient Silk Road connecting them with Merv to the east. It outgrew surrounding villages and became known by its current name, meaning "place of martyrdom", in reference to the Imam Reza shrine, where the eighth Shia Imam, Ali al-Rida, is buried. The Abbasid caliph Harun al-Rashid is also buried within the same shrine. The shrine is the most pilgrimaged site in Islam, visited by nearly 30 million each year.

Mashhad became associated with Ferdowsi, the Persian poet and author of the Shahnameh, who was born in Tus (with many institutions in Mashhad named after him). Mashhad enjoyed relative prosperity in the Mongol period, and continued to grow. Between 1736 and 1796, Mashhad became the capital of Afsharid Iran which was ruled by the Afsharid dynasty founded by Nader Shah, whose tomb is located in the city. In the modern era, Mashhad continued to expand and became the hometown of some of the most significant literary figures and artists of modern Iran, such as the poet Mehdi Akhavan-Sales, and the traditional Iranian singer and composer Mohammad-Reza Shajarian. On 30 October 2009 (the anniversary of Imam Reza's martyrdom), Iran's then-President Mahmoud Ahmadinejad declared Mashhad to be "The spiritual capital of Iran." The city was also named the Capital of Islamic Culture by the Organisation of Islamic Cooperation in 2017.

== History ==
=== Etymology and early history ===
Ancient Greek sources mention the passage and residence of Alexander the Great in this land, which was called "Susia" (Ancient Greek: Σούσια), in 330 BC. The map of Tabula Peutingeriana, which dates back to the early Roman era, names this city on the west of Merv, Alexandria, instead of Susia. Pliny the Elder, says there is a city in the middle of Parthia, near Arsace and Nisiaea, called "Alexandropolis" after its founder. Many Muslim historians, from the 10th to the 16th century AD, attribute the founding of "Sanabad" (the old name of the city) to Alexander.

Also in the Shia hadith sources, which the narrators connect to the 7th to 9th centuries AD, there are quotations that Imam Ridha and Harun al-Rashid are buried in a city founded by Dhu al-Qarnayn.

The older name of Mashhad is Sanabad (سناباد Sanâbâd). It was eventually renamed to Mashhad during the Safavid Empire. The name Mashhad comes from Arabic, meaning a Mazar (mausoleum). It is also known as the place where Ali ar-Ridha (Persian, Imam Reza), the eighth Imam of Shia Muslims, died (according to the Shias, was martyred). Reza's shrine was placed there.

The ancient Parthian city of Patigrabanâ, mentioned in the Behistun inscription (520 BC) of the Achaemenid Emperor Darius the Great, may have been located at the Mashhad.

At the beginning of the 9th century (3rd century AH), Mashhad was a small city called Sanabad, which was situated 24 kilometres (15 miles) away from Tus. There was a summer palace of Humayd ibn Qahtaba, the governor of Khurasan. In 808, when Harun al-Rashid, Abbasid caliph, was passing through to quell the insurrection of Rafi ibn al-Layth in Transoxania, he became ill and died. He was buried under the palace of Humayd ibn Qahtaba. Thus the Dar al-Imarah was known as the Mausoleum of Haruniyyeh. In 818, Ali al-Ridha was martyred by al-Ma'mun and was buried beside the grave of Harun. Although Mashhad owns the cultural heritage of Tus (including its figures like Nizam al-Mulk, Al-Ghazali, Ahmad Ghazali, Ferdowsi, Asadi Tusi, and Shaykh Tusi), earlier Arab geographers have correctly identified Mashhad and Tus as two separate cities that are now located about 19 kilometres (12 miles) from each other.

=== Mongolian invasion: Ilkhanids ===
Although some believe that after this event, the city was called Mashhad al-Ridha (the place of martyrdom of al-Ridha), it seems that Mashhad, as a place-name, first appears in al-Maqdisi, i.e., in the last third of the 10th century. About the middle of the 14th century, the traveller Ibn Battuta uses the expression "town of Mashhad al-Rida". Towards the end of the Middle Ages, the name Nuqan, which is still found on coins in the first half of the 14th century under the Il-Khanids, seems to have been gradually replaced by al-Mashhad or Mashhad.

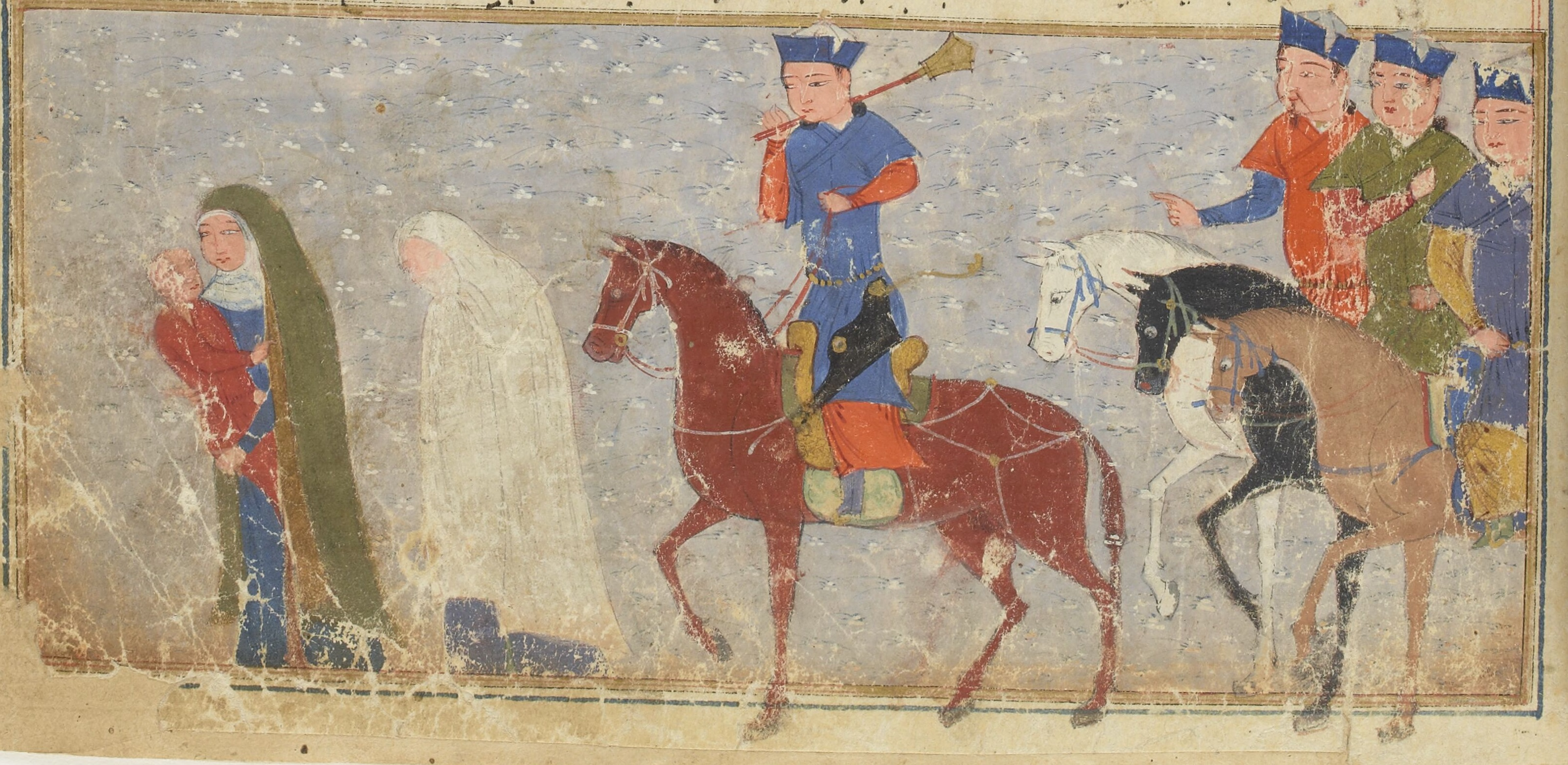
Terken Khatun, Empress of the Khwarazmian Empire, known as "the Queen of the Turks", held captive by Mongol army

Shias began to make pilgrimages to his grave. By the end of the 9th century, a dome was built above the grave, and many other buildings and bazaars sprang up around it. Over the course of more than a millennium, it has been destroyed and rebuilt several times. In 1161, however, the Seljuks seized the city, but they spared the sacred area their pillaging. Mashad al-Ridha was not considered a "great" city until Mongol raids in 1220, which caused the destruction of many large cities in Khurasan but leaving Mashhad relatively intact in the hands of Mongolian commanders because of the cemetery of Ali Al-Rezza and Harun al-Rashid (the latter was stolen). Thus the survivors of the massacres migrated to Mashhad. When the Arab traveller Ibn Battuta visited the town in 1333, he reported that it was a large town with abundant fruit trees, streams and mills. A great dome of elegant construction surmounts the noble mausoleum, the walls being decorated with colored tiles. The most well-known dish cooked in Mashhad, "sholeh Mashhadi" (شله مشهدی) or "Sholeh", dates back to the era of the Mongolian invasion when it is thought to be cooked with any food available (the main ingredients are meat, grains and abundant spices) and be a Mongolian word.

=== Timurid Empire ===
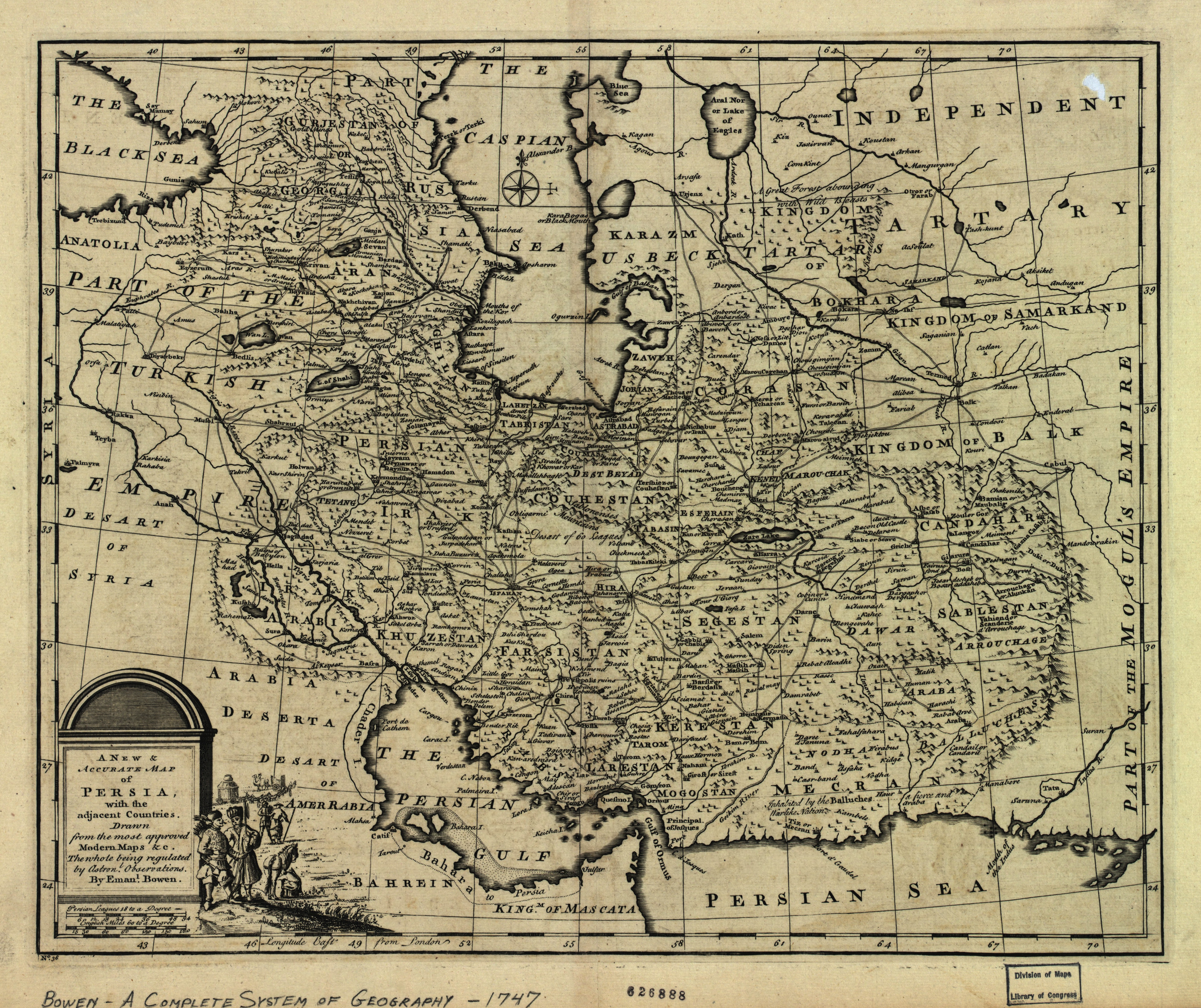
The map of the Persian Empire in 1747 at the time of Afsharid Dynasty. The name of Mashhad is seen belong Tous.

It seems that the importance of Sanabad-Mashhad continually increased with the growing fame of its sanctuary and the decline of Tus, which received its death-blow in 1389 from Miran Shah, a son of Timur. When the Kartid noble who governed the place rebelled and attempted to make himself independent, Miran Shah was sent against him by his father. Tus was stormed after a siege of several months, sacked and left a heap of ruins; 10,000 inhabitants were massacred. Those who escaped the holocaust settled in the shelter of the 'Alid sanctuary. Tus was henceforth abandoned and Mashhad took its place as the capital of the district.

Later on, during the reign of the Timurid Shahrukh Mirza, Mashhad became one of the main cities of the realm. In 1418, his wife Goharshad funded the construction of an outstanding mosque beside the shrine, which is known as the Goharshad Mosque. The mosque remains relatively intact to this date, its great size an indicator to the status the city held in the 15th century.

=== Safavid Empire ===
Ismail I, founder of the Safavid Empire, conquered Mashhad after the death of Husayn Bayqarah and the decline of the Timurid dynasty. He was later captured by the Uzbeks during the reign of Shah Abbas I. In the 16th century the town suffered considerably from the repeated raids of the Özbegs (Uzbeks). In 1507, it was taken by the troops of the Shaybani or Shabani Khan. After two decades, Shah Tahmasp I succeeded in repelling the enemy from the town again in 1528. But in 1544, the Özbegs again succeeded in entering the town and plundering and murdering there. The year 1589 was a disastrous one for Mashhad. The Shaybanid 'Abd al-Mu'min after a four months' siege forced the town to surrender. Shah Abbas I, who lived in Mashhad from 1585 until his official ascent of the throne in Qazwin in 1587, was not able to retake Mashhad from the Özbegs until 1598. Mashhad was retaken by the Shah Abbas after a long and hard struggle, defeating the Uzbeks in a great battle near Herat as well as managing to drive them beyond the Oxus River. Abbas the Great wanted to encourage Iranians to go to Mashhad for pilgrimage. He is said to have walked from Isfahan to Mashhad. During the Safavid era, Mashhad gained even more religious recognition, becoming the most important city of Greater Khorasan, as several madrasah and other structures were built beside the Imam Reza shrine. Besides its religious significance, Mashhad has played an important political role as well. The Safavid dynasty has been criticized in a book (Red Shi'sm vs. Black Shi'ism) on the perceived dual aspects of the Shi'a religion throughout history) as a period in which although the dynasty didn't form the idea of Black Shi'ism, but this idea was formed after the defeat of Shah Ismail against the Ottoman leader Sultan Yavuz Selim. Black Shi'ism is a product of the post-Safavid period.

=== Qajar Empire ===
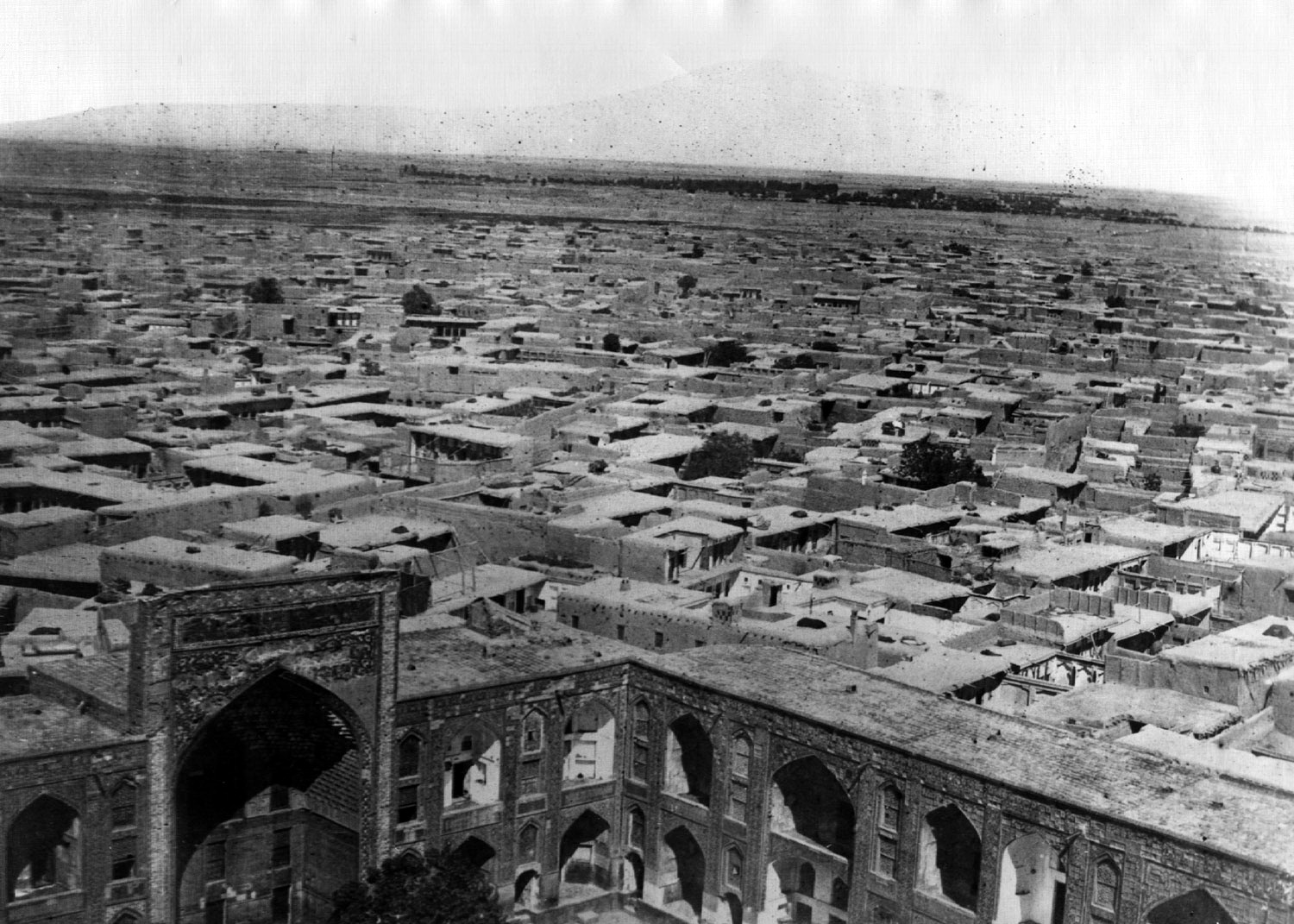
Mashhad in 1858

Some believe that Mashhad was ruled by Shahrukh Afshar and remained the capital of the Afsharid dynasty during Zand dynasty until Agha Mohammad Khan Qajar conquered the then larger region of Khorasan in 1796.

==== 1912 Imam Reza shrine bombardment ====
In 1911 Yusuf Khan of Herat was declared independent in Mashhad as Muhammad Ali Shah and brought together a large group of reactionaries opposed to the revolution, and keep stirring for some time. This gave Russia the excuse to intervene and 29 March 1912 bombed the city; this bombing killed several people and pilgrims; action against a Muslim shrine caused a great shock to all Islamic countries. On 29 March 1912, the sanctuary of Imam Reza was bombed by the Russian artillery fire, causing some damage, including to the golden dome, resulting in a widespread and persisting resentment in the Shiite Muslim world as well as British India. This bombing was orchestrated by Prince Aristid Mikhailovich Dabizha (a Moldovan who was the Russian Consul in Mashhad) and General Radko (a Bulgarian who was commander of the Russian Cossacks in the city). Yusuf Khan ended up captured by the Persians and was executed.

=== Pahlavi dynasty ===
==== Modernization under Reza Shah ====
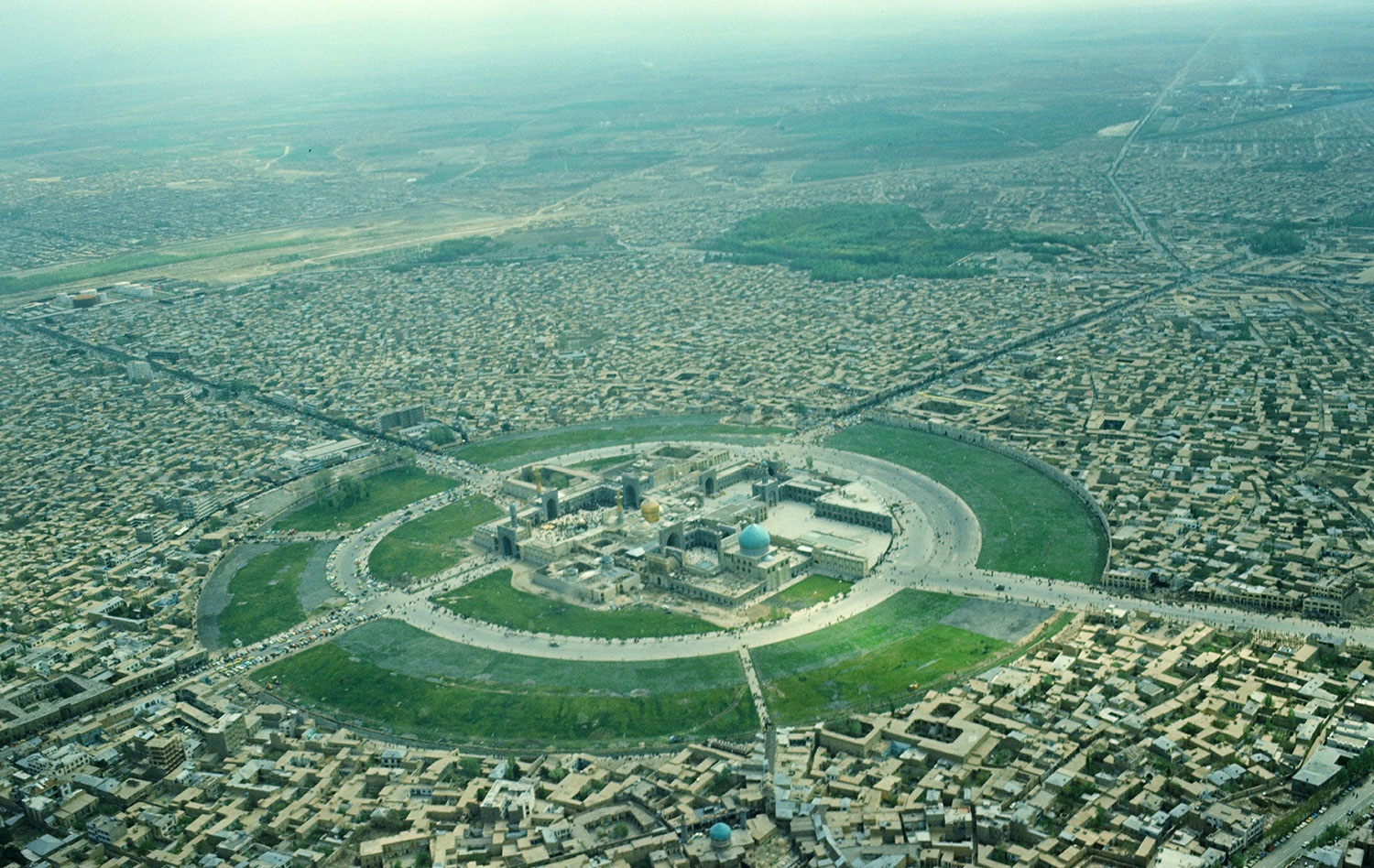
Aerial view of imam Reza shrine, 1976

The modern development of the city accelerated under Reza Shah (1925-1941). Shah Reza Hospital (currently Imam Reza Hospital, affiliated with the Basij organization) was founded in 1934; the sugar factory of Abkuh in 1935; and the Mashhad University of Medical Sciences in 1939. The city's first power station was installed in 1936, and in 1939, the first urban transport service began with two buses. In this year the first population census was performed, with a result of 76,471 inhabitants.

==== 1935 Goharshad Mosque rebellion ====
In 1935, a backlash against the modernizing, anti-religious policies of Reza Pahlavi erupted in the Mashhad shrine. Responding to a cleric who denounced the Shah's heretical innovations, corruption, and heavy consumer taxes, many bazaars and villagers took refuge in the shrine, chanted slogans such as "The Shah is a new Yazid." For four days local police and army refused to violate the shrine and the standoff was ended when troops from Azerbaijan arrived and broke into the shrine, killing dozens and injuring hundreds, and marking a final rupture between Shi'ite clergy and the Shah. According to some Mashhadi historians, the Goharshad Mosque uprising, which took place in 1935, is an uprising against Reza Shah's decree banning all veils (headscarf and chador) on 8 January 1936.

==== 1941–1979 reforms ====
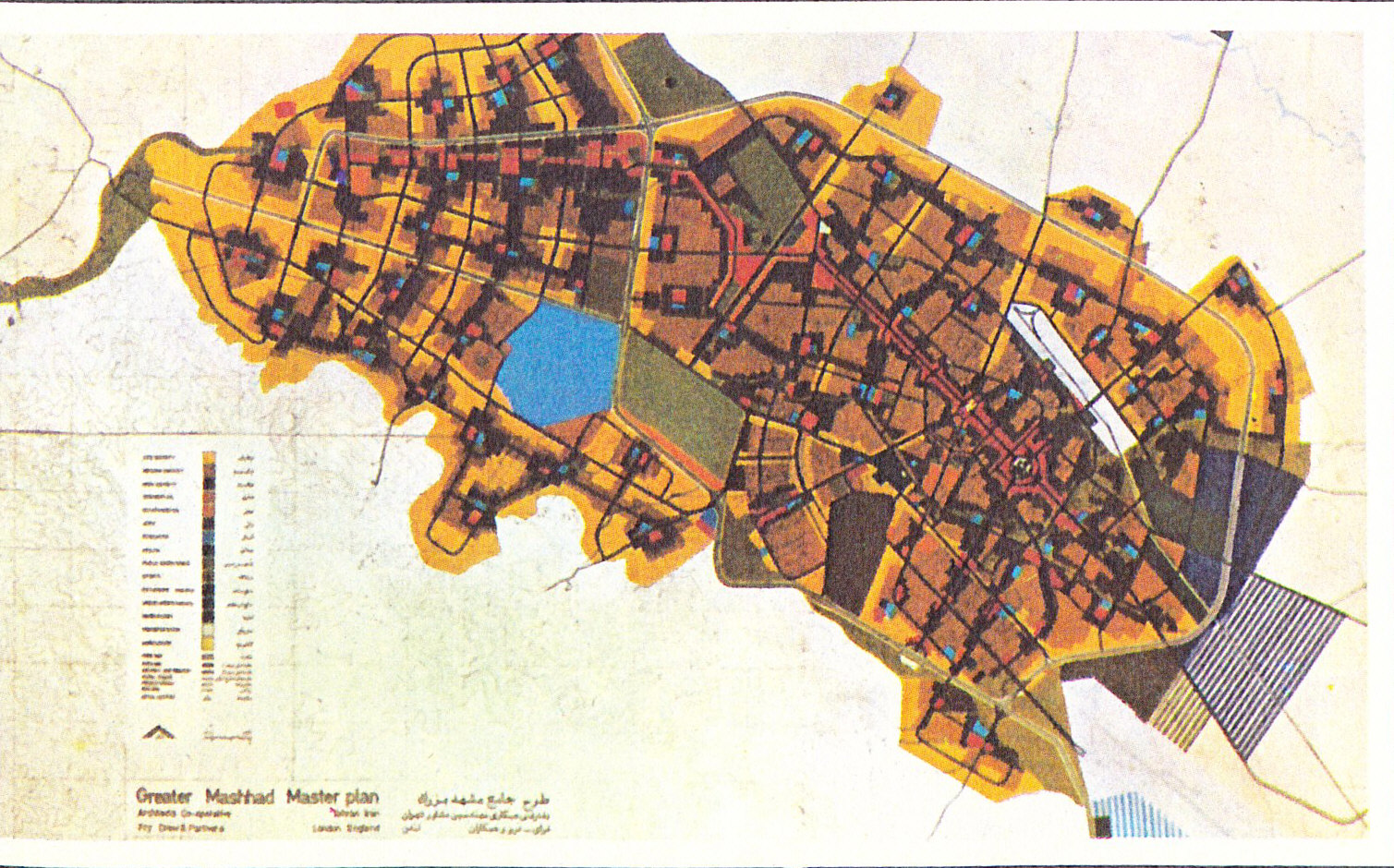
Comprehensive planning of Mashhad in 1974

Mashhad experienced population growth after the Anglo-Soviet invasion of Iran in 1941 because of relative insecurity in rural areas, the 1948 drought, and the establishment of Mashhad University in 1949. At the same time, public transport vehicles increased to 77 buses and 200 taxis and the railway link with the capital, Tehran, was established in 1957. The 1956 census reflected a population of 241,989 people. The increase in population continued in the following years thanks to the increase in Iranian oil revenues, the decline of the feudal social model, the agrarian reform of 1963, the founding of the city's airport, the creation of new factories and the development of the health system. In 1966, the population reached 409,616 inhabitants, and 667,770 in 1976. The extension of the city was expanded from 16 to 33 square kilometres (170,000,000 to 360,000,000 square feet).

During World War II, Polish refugee children were admitted in Mashhad in March 1942 (see also Iran–Poland relations). After receiving food and medical care at a local hospital, the children were further evacuated to India.

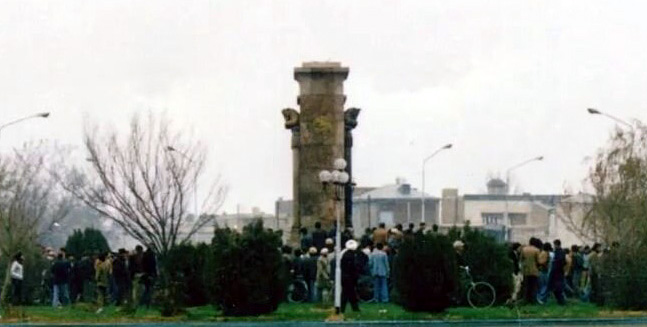
Mashhad Statue Sq. 1960s

In 1965 an important urban renewal development project for the surroundings of the shrine of Imam Reza was proposed by the Iranian architect and urban designer Dariush Borbor to replace the dilapidated slum conditions which surrounded the historic monuments. The project was officially approved in 1968. In 1977 the surrounding areas were demolished to make way for the implementation of this project. To relocate the demolished businesses, a new bazaar was designed and constructed in Meydan-e Ab square (in Persian, "میدان آب") by Dariush Borbor. After the revolution, the urban renewal project was abandoned.

==== 1994 Imam Reza shrine bombing ====
On 20 June 1994, a bomb exploded in a prayer hall of the shrine of the Imam Reza. The bomb that killed at least 25 people on 20 June in Mashhad exploded on Ashura. The Pakistani terrorist Ramzi Yousef, a Sunni Muslim turned Wahhabi, one of the main perpetrators of the 1993 World Trade Center bombing, was found to be behind the plot.

==== 2026 Iran massacres ====
On 22 January 2026, during the 2026 Iran massacres, 33-year-old Ali Rahbar was reportedly executed in Mashhad, becoming one of the first protesters to be executed. Iran's judiciary denied his execution having taken place, stating that such a person had not even been detained.

== Geography ==
The city is located at 36.20º North latitude and 59.35º East longitude, in the valley of the Kashafrud River near Turkmenistan, between the two mountain ranges of Binalood and Hezar Masjed Mountains. The city benefits from the proximity of the mountains, having cool winters, pleasant springs, and mild summers. It is only about 250 km (160 mi) from Ashgabat, Turkmenistan.

The city is the administrative center of Mashhad County (or the shahrestan of Mashhad) as well as the somewhat smaller Central District (Bakhsh-e Markazi) of Mashhad. The city itself, excluding parts of the surrounding Bakhsh and Shahrestan, is divided into 13 smaller administrative units, with a total population of more than 3 million.

=== Climate ===
Mashhad features a cold semi-arid climate (Köppen BSk; Trewartha: BShk) with very hot summers, cold winters and Mediterranean-like dry summer precipitation pattern. The city only sees about 250 millimetres (9.8 inches) of precipitation per year, some of which occasionally falls in the form of snow. Mashhad has wetter and drier periods with the bulk of the annual precipitation falling between the months of December and May. Summers are typically hot and dry, with average high temperatures exceeding 33 °C or 91.4 °F for three months. Winters are typically cool to cold and somewhat damper, with overnight lows routinely dropping below freezing. Mashhad enjoys on average just above 2900 hours of sunshine per year.

Snow cover had been observed in 21.1 days annually, with only 3.8 days in which the snow depth exceeds 0.10 metres or 4 inches.

The highest recorded temperature was 43.8 °C or 110.8 °F on 6 July 1998 and the lowest recorded temperature was −28 °C or −18.4 °F on 3 February 1972.

Climate data for Mashhad (1991–2020, extremes 1951–2020; elevation: 999.2 metres or 3,278 feet (Note: Rainy days calculated using Parameter codes 47 and 71 from the source))
Month	Jan	Feb	Mar	Apr	May	Jun	Jul	Aug	Sep	Oct	Nov	Dec	Year
Record high °C (°F)	24.0 (75.2)	27.4 (81.3)	32.9 (91.2)	35.4 (95.7)	40.6 (105.1)	42.1 (107.8)	43.8 (110.8)	42.4 (108.3)	42.0 (107.6)	35.9 (96.6)	31.2 (88.2)	28.2 (82.8)	43.8 (110.8)
Mean daily maximum °C (°F)	8.5 (47.3)	10.6 (51.1)	15.7 (60.3)	22.0 (71.6)	27.9 (82.2)	33.4 (92.1)	35.3 (95.5)	34.0 (93.2)	29.7 (85.5)	23.3 (73.9)	15.6 (60.1)	10.7 (51.3)	22.2 (72.0)
Daily mean °C (°F)	2.8 (37.0)	4.7 (40.5)	9.5 (49.1)	15.4 (59.7)	21.1 (70.0)	26.4 (79.5)	28.5 (83.3)	26.7 (80.1)	21.9 (71.4)	15.5 (59.9)	8.9 (48.0)	4.6 (40.3)	15.5 (59.9)
Mean daily minimum °C (°F)	−1.8 (28.8)	−0.1 (31.8)	4.3 (39.7)	9.6 (49.3)	14.3 (57.7)	18.7 (65.7)	20.9 (69.6)	18.8 (65.8)	14.1 (57.4)	8.5 (47.3)	3.6 (38.5)	0.0 (32.0)	9.2 (48.6)
Record low °C (°F)	−27.0 (−16.6)	−28.0 (−18.4)	−13.0 (8.6)	−7.0 (19.4)	−1.0 (30.2)	4.0 (39.2)	10.0 (50.0)	5.0 (41.0)	−1.0 (30.2)	−8.0 (17.6)	−16.0 (3.2)	−25.0 (−13.0)	−28.0 (−18.4)
Average precipitation mm (inches)	27.5 (1.08)	35.7 (1.41)	56.3 (2.22)	39.4 (1.55)	30.6 (1.20)	5.9 (0.23)	1.7 (0.07)	0.8 (0.03)	2.7 (0.11)	7.9 (0.31)	17.2 (0.68)	20.1 (0.79)	245.8 (9.68)
Average precipitation days (≥ 1.0 mm)	4.8	5.7	7.4	5.5	5	1.4	0.4	0.2	0.4	1.5	3.2	3.3	38.8
Average rainy days	4.5	7.2	10.3	9.9	6.9	2	0.6	0.5	0.7	2.9	5.4	5.5	56.4
Average snowy days	5.8	2.6	0.5	0.1	0	0	0	0	0	0.2	1.7	4.3	15.2
Average relative humidity (%)	70	68	65	57	45	31	28	28	32	43	62	69	50
Average dew point °C (°F)	−3.1 (26.4)	−1.9 (28.6)	1.8 (35.2)	5.4 (41.7)	6.9 (44.4)	6.1 (43.0)	6.7 (44.1)	4.8 (40.6)	2.9 (37.2)	1.4 (34.5)	0.6 (33.1)	−1.5 (29.3)	2.5 (36.5)
Mean monthly sunshine hours	151	152	173	214	285	347	376	366	312	257	179	151	2,963
Source 1: NOAA NCEI(Days with Snowfall 1981-2010)
Source 2: Iran Meteorological Organization(Records)

Climate data for Mashhad (1951–2010)
Month	Jan	Feb	Mar	Apr	May	Jun	Jul	Aug	Sep	Oct	Nov	Dec	Year
Record high °C (°F)	24.0 (75.2)	26.0 (78.8)	32.0 (89.6)	35.4 (95.7)	40.6 (105.1)	42.1 (107.8)	43.8 (110.8)	42.4 (108.3)	42.0 (107.6)	35.8 (96.4)	29.4 (84.9)	28.2 (82.8)	43.8 (110.8)
Mean daily maximum °C (°F)	7.1 (44.8)	9.3 (48.7)	14.2 (57.6)	20.9 (69.6)	26.8 (80.2)	32.3 (90.1)	34.4 (93.9)	33.1 (91.6)	28.9 (84.0)	22.5 (72.5)	15.5 (59.9)	9.8 (49.6)	21.2 (70.2)
Daily mean °C (°F)	1.7 (35.1)	3.7 (38.7)	8.5 (47.3)	14.7 (58.5)	19.6 (67.3)	24.4 (75.9)	26.6 (79.9)	24.8 (76.6)	20.3 (68.5)	14.5 (58.1)	8.7 (47.7)	4.0 (39.2)	14.3 (57.7)
Mean daily minimum °C (°F)	−3.8 (25.2)	−1.8 (28.8)	2.9 (37.2)	8.4 (47.1)	12.4 (54.3)	16.4 (61.5)	18.7 (65.7)	16.5 (61.7)	11.7 (53.1)	6.4 (43.5)	1.9 (35.4)	−1.7 (28.9)	7.3 (45.2)
Record low °C (°F)	−27.0 (−16.6)	−28.0 (−18.4)	−13.0 (8.6)	−7.0 (19.4)	−1.0 (30.2)	4.0 (39.2)	10.0 (50.0)	5.0 (41.0)	−1.0 (30.2)	−8.0 (17.6)	−16.0 (3.2)	−25.0 (−13.0)	−28.0 (−18.4)
Average precipitation mm (inches)	32.6 (1.28)	34.5 (1.36)	55.5 (2.19)	45.4 (1.79)	27.2 (1.07)	4.0 (0.16)	1.1 (0.04)	0.7 (0.03)	2.1 (0.08)	8.0 (0.31)	16.1 (0.63)	24.3 (0.96)	251.5 (9.90)
Average precipitation days (≥ 1.0 mm)	8.6	10.4	13.8	12.1	8.7	2.5	0.9	0.5	0.9	3.9	5.3	8.1	75.7
Average snowy days	5.6	5.8	4.0	0.4	0.0	0.0	0.0	0.0	0.0	0.1	1.2	3.8	20.9
Average relative humidity (%)	75	73	69	62	50	37	34	33	37	49	63	73	54
Mean monthly sunshine hours	148.3	147.5	163.3	200.4	280.4	343.2	366.9	359.7	305.2	249.5	188.3	151.6	2,904.3
Source: Iran Meteorological Organization (records), (temperatures), (precipitation), (humidity), (days with precipitation), (sunshine)

== Demography ==
=== Population ===
Historical population
Year	Pop.	±% p.a.
1986	1,463,508	—
1991	1,559,155	+1.27%
1996	1,887,405	+3.90%
2006	2,427,316	+2.55%
2011	2,766,258	+2.65%
2016	3,001,184	+1.64%
2022	3,619,000	+3.17%

At the time of the 2006 National Census, the city's population was 2,410,800 in 621,697 households. The following census in 2011 counted 2,766,258 people in 804,391 households. The 2016 census measured the population of the city as 3,001,184 people in 914,146 households.

=== Ethnic groups ===
The vast majority of Mashhadi people are ethnic Persians, who form the majority of the city's population. Other ethnic groups include Kurdish and Turkmen people who have emigrated recently to the city from the North Khorasan province. There is also a significant community of non-Arabic speakers of Arabian descent who have retained a distinct Arabian culture, cuisine and religious practices.

There are also over 20 million pilgrims who visit the city every year.

Ethnic Groups
Persians	92.5%
Kurds	3%
Turkmens	2%
Arabs	0.1%
Others	0.4%

=== Religion ===
Today, the holy shrine and its museum hold extensive cultural and artistic treasuries of Iran, in particular manuscript books and paintings. Several theological schools are associated with the shrine of the Eighth Imam.

The second-largest holy city in the world, Mashhad attracts more than 20 million tourists and pilgrims every year, many of whom come to pay homage to the Imam Reza shrine (the eighth Shi'ite Imam). It has been a magnet for travellers since medieval times. Thus, even as those who complete the pilgrimage to Mecca receive the title of Haji, those who make the pilgrimage to Mashhad—and especially to the Imam Reza shrine—are known as Mashtee, a term employed also of its inhabitants. As an important problem, the duration when new passengers stay in Mashhad has been considerably reduced to 2 days and they prefer to finish their trip immediately after doing pilgrimage and shopping in the markets. There are about 3000–5000 unauthorized residential units in Mashhad, which, as a unique statistic worldwide, has caused various problems in the city.

Although mainly inhabited by Muslims, there were in the past some religious minorities in Mashhad. They were mainly Jews, who were forcibly converted to Islam in 1839 after the Allahdad pogrom took place for Mashhadi Jews in 1839. They became known as Jadid al-Islam ("Newcomers in Islam"). On the outside, they adapted to the Islamic way of life, but often secretly kept their faith and traditions.

== Economy ==
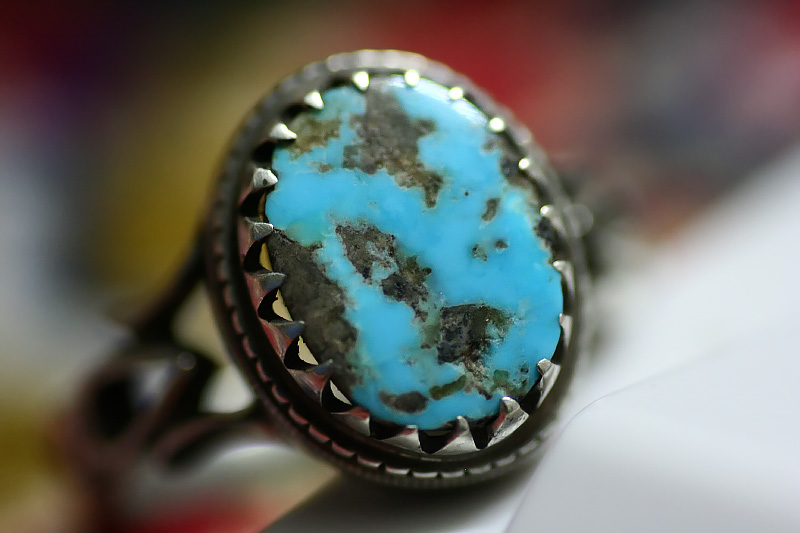
Turquoise, one of the products of Mashhad

Mashhad is Iran's second largest automobile production hub. The city's economy is based mainly on dry fruits, salted nuts, saffron, Iranian sweets like gaz and sohaan, and precious stones. According to old writings and documents, the oldest existing carpet attributed to the city belongs to the reign of Shah Abbas (Abbas I of Persia). Also, there is a type of carpet, classified as Mashhad Turkbâf, which, as its name suggests, is woven by hand with Turkish knots by craftsmen who emigrated from Tabriz to Mashhad in the nineteenth century. Among other major industries in the city are the nutrition, clothing, leather, textiles, chemical, steel, metallic, and non-metallic mineral industries, construction materials factories, & the handicraft industry.

With more than 55% of all the hotels in Iran, Mashhad is the hub of tourism in the country. Religious shrines are the most powerful attractions for foreign travelers; 20 to 30 million pilgrims from Iran and more than 2 million pilgrims and tourists from elsewhere around the world came to Mashhad every year as of 2015.

Unemployment, poverty, drug addiction, and theft are the most important social problems of the city.

The divorce rate in Mashhad had increased by 35 percent by 2014. Khorasan and Mashhad ranked second in violence across the country in 2013.

=== Astan Quds Razavi ===
At the same time, the city has kept its character as a goal of pilgrimage, dominated by the strength of the economic and political authority of the Astan Quds Razavi, the administration of the Shrine waqf, probably the most important in the Muslim world and the largest active bonyad in Iran. The Astan Quds Razavi is a major player in the economy of the city of Mashhad. The land occupied by the shrine has grown fourfold since 1979 according to the head of the foundation's international relations department. The Shrine of Imam Reza is vaster than Vatican City. The foundation owns most of the real estate in Mashhad and rents out shop space to bazaaris and hoteliers. The main resource of the institution is endowments, estimated to have annual revenue of $210 billion. Ahmad Marvi is the current Custodian of Astan Quds Razavi.

=== Padideh Shandiz ===
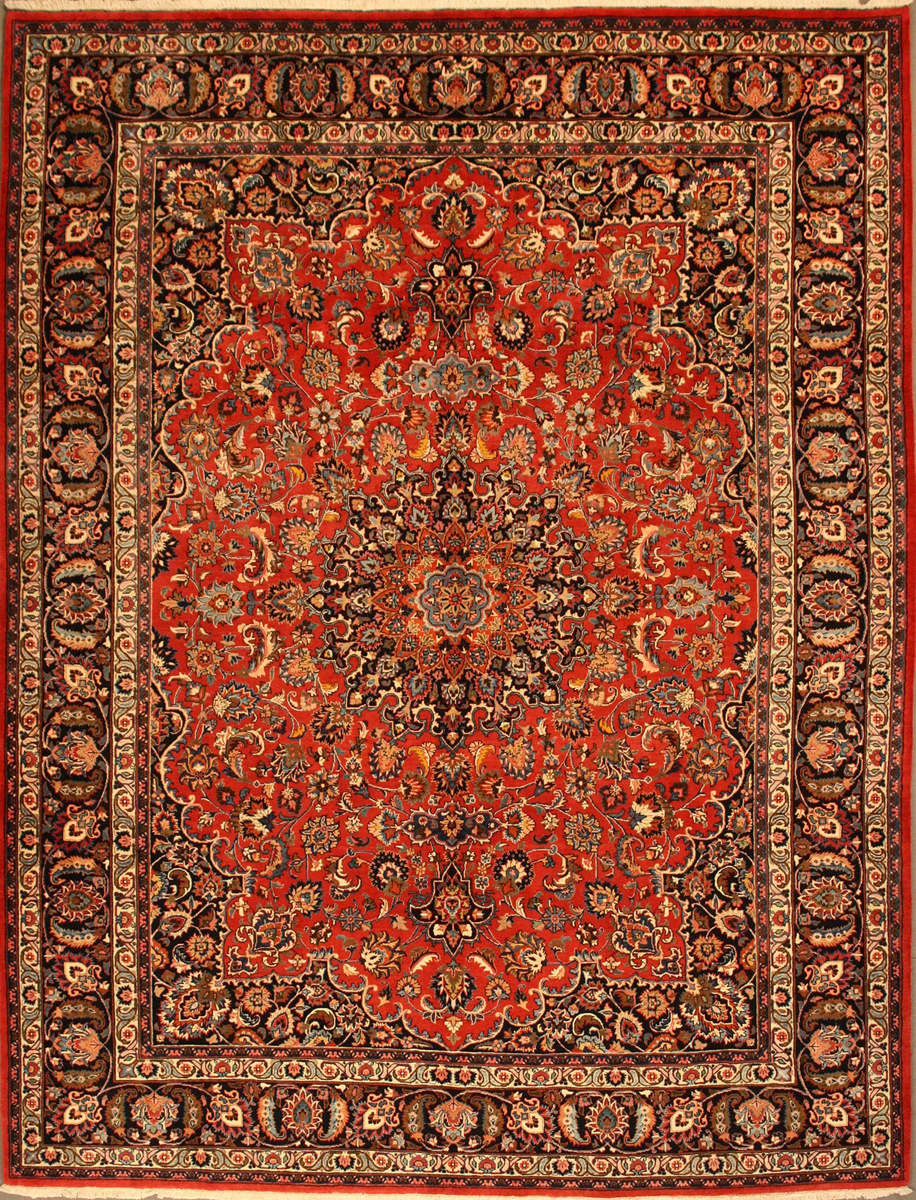
Mashhad Carpet

Padideh Shandiz International Tourism Development Company, an Iranian private joint-stock holding company, behaves like a public company by selling stocks despite being a joint-stock in the field of restaurants, tourism and construction, with a football club (Padideh F.C.; formerly named Azadegan League club Mes Sarcheshmeh). In January 2015, the company was accused of "fraud" worth $34.3 billion, which is one eighth of the Iranian budget.

=== Credit institutions ===
Several credit institutions have been established in Mashhad, including Samenolhojaj (مؤسسه مالی و اعتباری ثامن الحجج), Samenola'emmeh (مؤسسه اعتباری ثامن) and Melal (formerly Askariye, مؤسسه اعتباری عسکریه). The depositors of the first institution have faced problems in receiving cash from the institution.

=== Others ===
The city's International Exhibition Center is the second most active exhibition center after Tehran, which due to proximity to Central Asian countries hosts dozens of international exhibitions each year. Companies such as Smart-innovators in Mashhad are pioneers in electrical and computer technology.

== Language ==
The language mainly spoken in Mashhad is Persian with a variating Mashhadi accent, which can at times, prove itself as a sort of dialect. The Mashhadi Persian dialect is somewhat different from the standard Persian dialect in some of its tones and stresses.

== Culture ==
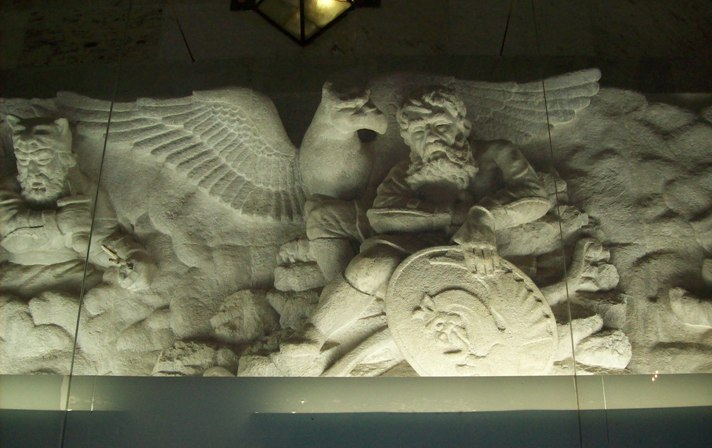
Relief in Tous depicting popular stories of Persian mythology, from the book of Shahnameh of Ferdowsi

=== Religious seminaries ===
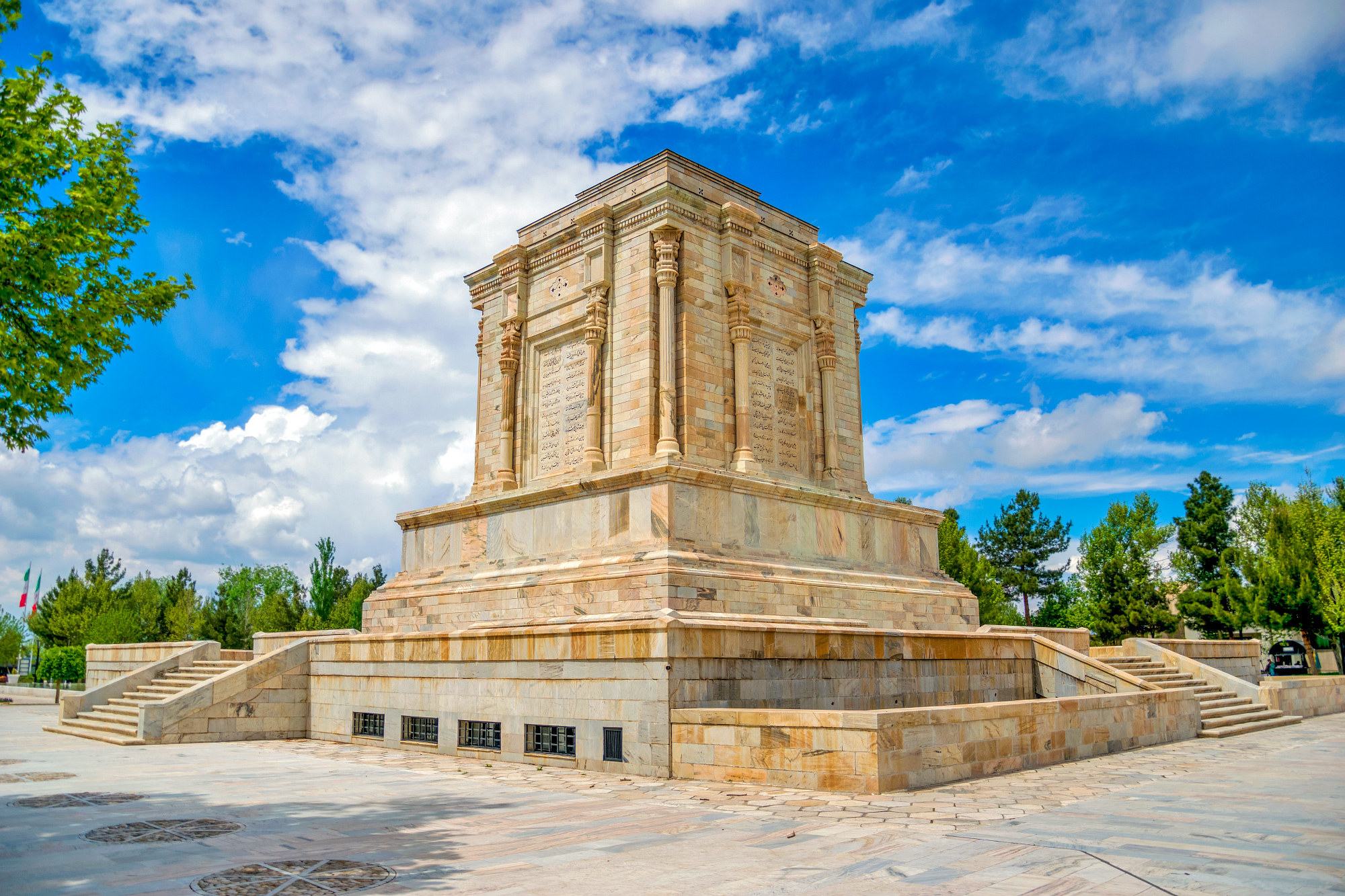
Tomb of Ferdowsi in Tous

Long a center of secular and religious learning, Mashhad has been a center for the Islamic arts and sciences, as well as piety and pilgrimage. Mashhad was an educational centre, with a considerable number of Islamic schools (madrasas, the majority of them, however, dating from the later Safavid period. Mashhad Hawza (Persian: حوزه علمیه مشهد) is one of the largest seminaries of traditional Islamic school of higher learning in Mashhad, which was headed by Abbas Vaez-Tabasi (who was Chairman of the Astan Quds Razavi board from 1979) after the revolution, and in which Iranian politician and clerics such as Ali Khamenei, Ahmad Alamolhoda, Abolghasem Khazali, Mohammad Reyshahri, Morteza Motahhari, Abbas Vaez-Tabasi, and Madmoud Halabi (the founder of Hojjatieh and Mohammad Hadi Abd-e Khodaee learned Islamic studies). The number of seminary schools in Mashhad is now thirty nine and there are an estimated 2,300 seminarians in the city.

The Ferdowsi University of Mashhad, named after the Iranian poet, is located here. The Madrassa of Ayatollah Al-Khoei, originally built in the seventeenth century, is the city's traditional centre for religious learning. The Razavi University of Islamic Sciences, founded in 1984, stands at the centre of town, within the shrine complex.

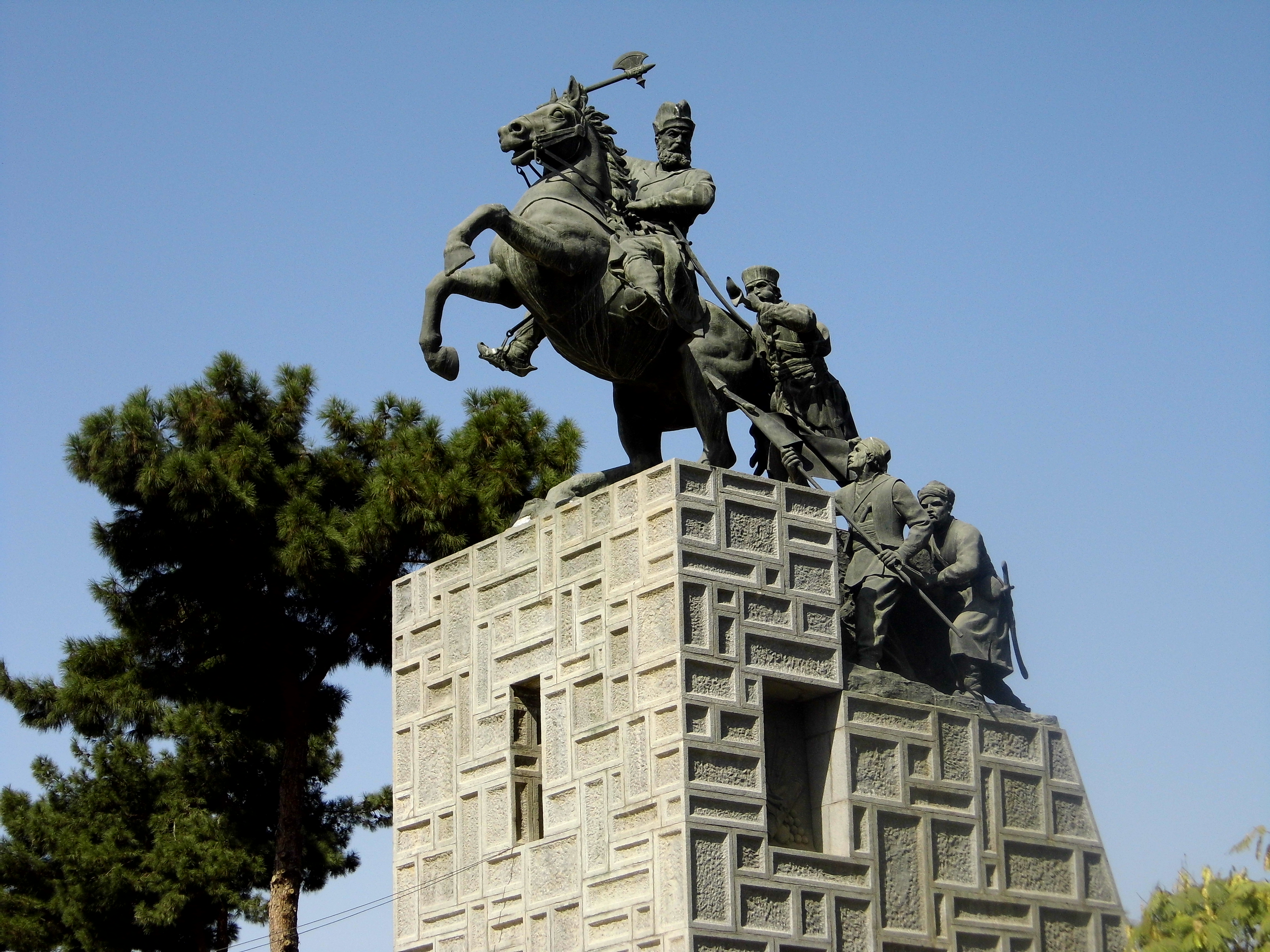
Tomb of Nader Shah

Mashhad is also home to one of the oldest libraries of the Middle-East called the Central Library of Astan Quds Razavi with a history of over six centuries. There are some six million historical documents in the foundation's central library. A museum is also home to over 70,000 manuscripts from various historical eras.

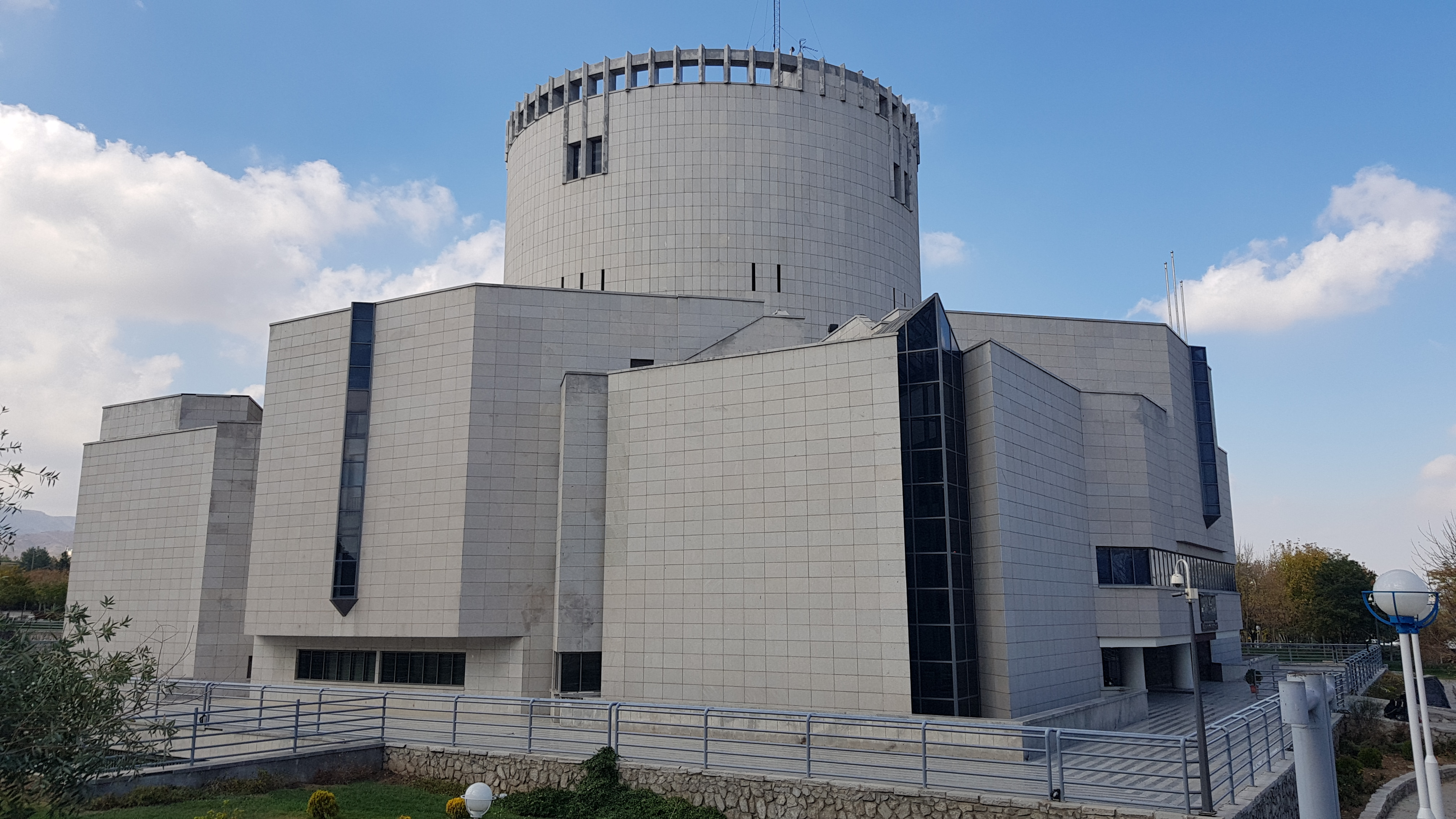
Central Museum of great Khorasan, Mashhad, next to Koohsangi

The Astan Quds Razavi Central Museum, which is part of the Astan-e Quds Razavi Complex, contains Islamic art and historical artifacts. In 1976, a new edifice was designed and constructed by the Iranian architect Dariush Borbor to house the museum and the manuscripts.

In 1569 (977 H), 'Imad al-Din Mas'ud Shirazi, a physician at the Mashhad hospital, wrote the earliest Islamic treatise on syphilis, one influenced by European medical thought. Kashmar rug is a type of Persian rug indigenous to this region.

During recent years, Mashhad has been a clerical base to monitor the affairs and decisions of state. In 2015, Mashhad's clerics publicly criticized the performance of concert in Mashhad, which led to the order of cancellation of concerts in the city by Ali Jannati, the minister of culture, and then his resignation on 19 October 2016.

=== Newspapers ===
There are three influential newspapers in Mashhad, Khorasan (خراسان), Qods (قدس) and Shahrara (شهرآرا), which have been considered "conservative newspapers". They are three Mashhad-based daily published by and representing the views of their current and old owners: Foundation of Martyrs and Veterans Affairs, Astan Quds Razavi and Mashhad Municipality, respectively.

=== Capital of Islamic culture ===
The Islamic Educational, Scientific and Cultural Organization named Mashhad 2017's "cultural capital of the Muslim world" in Asia. Several international events, especially entrepreneurs networking event entitled Entrepreneurs Show 2017, was organized by CODE International in collaboration with Ferdowsi University of Mashhad, Khorasan Science and Technology Park, and city district government of Mashhad.

== Main sites ==
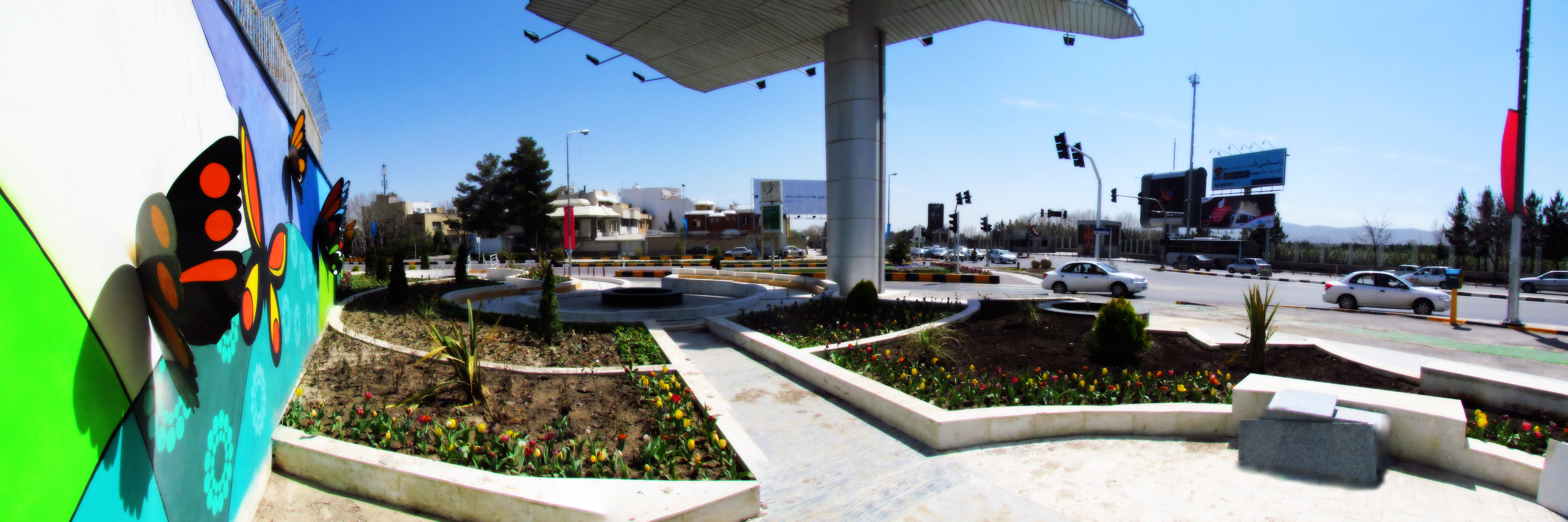
Khayam Street

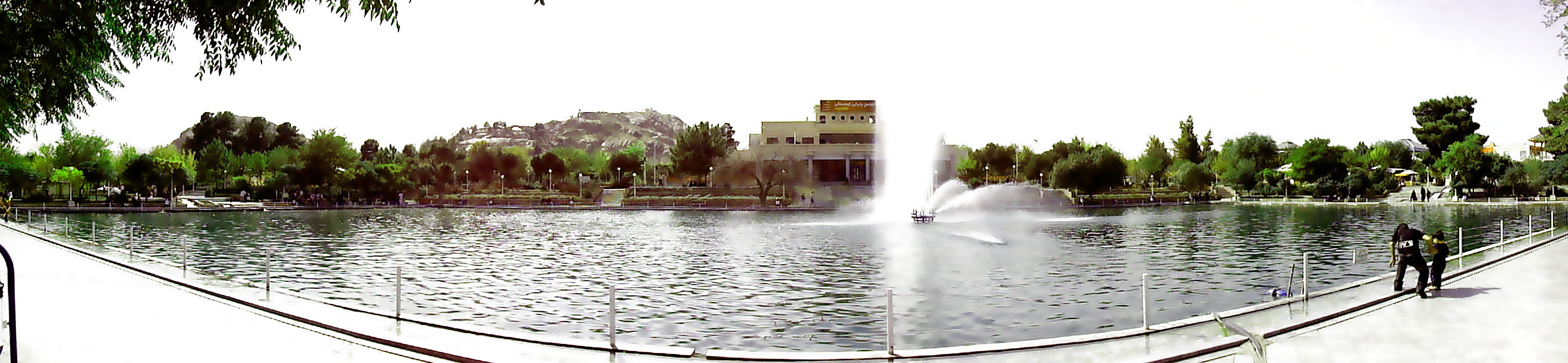
Main lake of Koohsangi Park

Apart from Imam Reza shrine, there are a number of parks, the tombs of historical celebrities in nearby Tus and Nishapur, the tomb of Nader Shah and Koohsangi park. The Koohestan Park-e-Shadi Complex includes a zoo, where wild animals are kept. It is also home to the Mashhad Airbase (formerly Imam Reza airbase), jointly a military installation housing Mirage aircraft, and a civilian international airport. Khurshid castle, Vakil Abad Park, Miniature Park, Professor Bazima Science Park, Astan Quds Razavi Museum, Keshti Dome, Harunieh Dome, Bird Garden, Anthropology Museum or Mehdi Qolibek Bath, Mellat Park, Naderi Museum and Bread Museum They are other sightseeing centers of Mashhad.

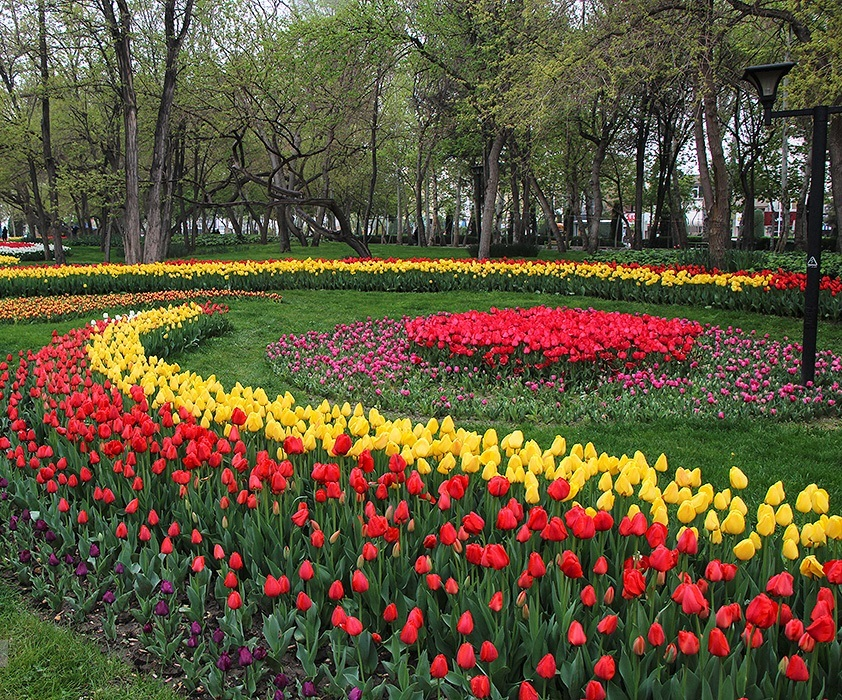
Mashhad Mellat Zana Park

Some points of interest lie outside the city: the tomb of Khajeh Morad, along the road to Tehran; the tomb of Khajeh Rabi' located 6 kilometres (3.7 miles) north of the city where there are some inscriptions by the Safavid calligrapher Reza Abbasi; and the tomb of Khajeh Abasalt, a distance of 20 kilometres (12 miles) from Mashhad along the road to Neishabur (the three were all disciples of Imam Reza).

Among other sights are the tomb of the poet Ferdowsi in Tus, 24 kilometres (15 miles) distance, and the summer resorts at Torghabeh, Torogh, Akhlamad, Zoshk, and Shandiz. The Shah Public Bath, built during the Safavid era in 1648, is an example of the architecture of that period.

== Transportation ==
=== Airport ===
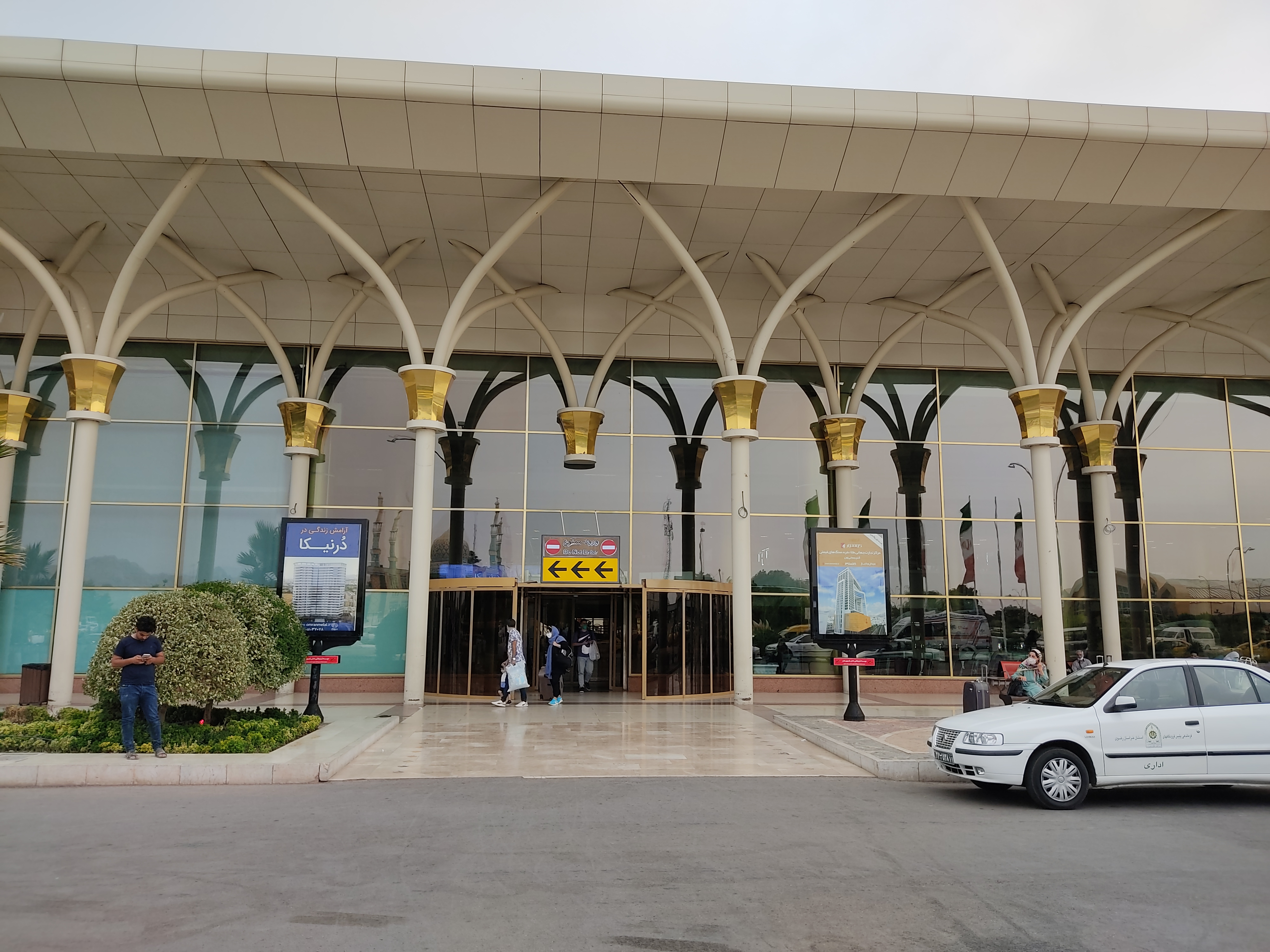
Domestic Flights Terminal of Mashhad International Airport

Mashhad is served by the Mashhad International Airport, which handles domestic flights to Iranian cities and international flights, mostly to neighbouring Arab countries. The airbase serves jointly as a civilian airport and a military airbase. During the June 2025 Israeli strikes on Iran, it was reported on 15 June that the Israeli Air Force bombed an aerial refueling plane at the airport.

The airport is the country's second-busiest after Tehran Mehrabad Airport and above Tehran's Imam Khomeini International Airport.

As of 2015 it was connected to 57 destinations and had frequent flights to 30 cities within Iran and 27 destinations in the Central Asia, the Middle East, East Asia and Europe.

=== Rail ===
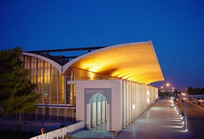
Mashhad railway station

Locating for Mashhad railway station construction in 1954

Mashhad railway station has Local, Regional, InterRegio, and InterRegio-Express services. The station is owned by IRI Railways and has daily services from most parts of the country, plus two suburban services. The building was designed by Heydar Ghiai. Mashhad is connected to three major rail lines: Tehran-Mashhad, Mashhad-Bafq (running south), and Mashhad-Sarakhs at the border with Turkmenistan. Some freight trains continue from Sarakhs towards Uzbekistan and to Kazakhstan, but have to change bogies because of the difference in Rail gauge. Cargo and passenger rail services are provided or operated by RAJA Rail Transportation Co., Joopar Co., and Fadak Trains Co. A new service from Nakhchivan, Azerbaijan, to Mashhad, Iran, was launched in December 2016.

In April 2025, Iran and Turkmenistan agreed to start a cross-border passenger train linking Mashhard and Merv, Turkmenistan's capital, with the goal of strengthening economic ties.

=== Railway & Subway ===
Mashhad Urban Railway Corporation (MURCO) is constructing metro and light rail system for the city of Mashhad which includes four lines with 84.5 kilometres (52.5 miles) length. Mashhad Urban Railway Operation Company (MUROC) is responsible for the operation of the lines. The LRT line has been operational since 21 February 2011 with 19.5 kilometres (12.1 miles) length and 22 stations and is connected to Mashhad International Airport from early 2016. The total length of line 1 is 24 kilometers and has 24 stations. the current headway in peak hours is 4.5 minutes.

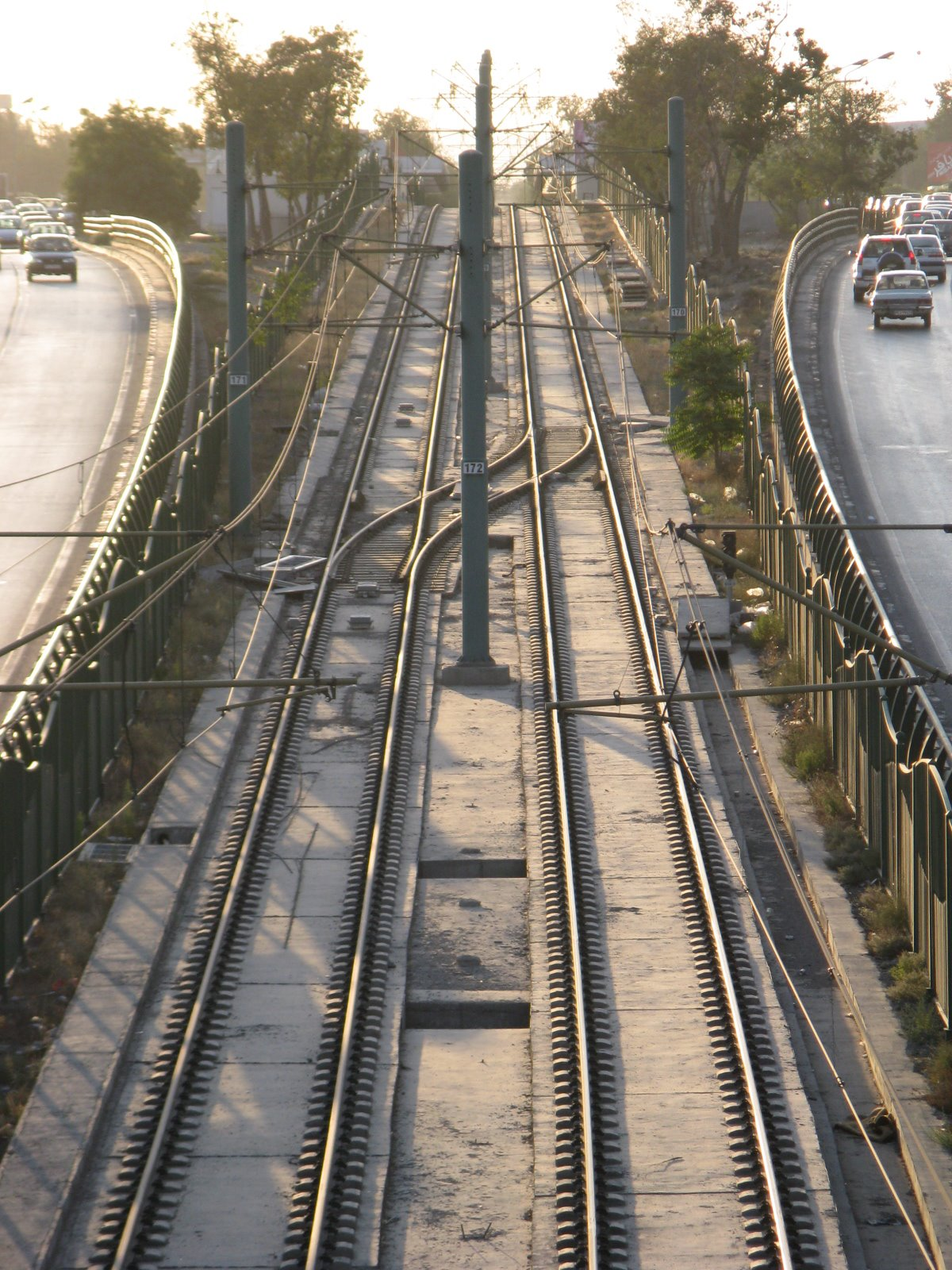
Panoramic perspective of Vakilabad LRTs

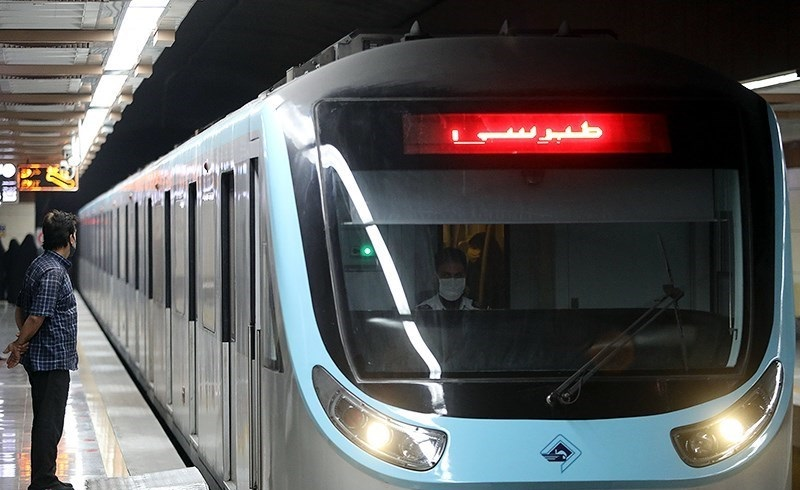
Mashhad Light Rail

The second line which is a metro line with 14.5 km length and 13 stations. line 2 construction was planned to finish in early 2020. The first phase of line 2 with 8 kilometers and 7 stations is started on 21 February 2017. On 20 March two stations were added to the network in test operational mode and the first interchange station was added to the network. On 7 May 2018, Iranian President Hassan Rouhani took part in the inauguration ceremony of the first Mashhad Urban Railway interchange station, "Shariati", which connects line 1 and 2. in 27 July shahid Kaveh station operation began and the length of the operational part of line 2 reached to 13.5 kilometers. On 18 November 2019 Alandasht station Began operative. Currently, line 2 operates every day with 13.5 km and 11 stations from 6 am to 10 pm, and the current headway is 10 minutes. Currently Mashhad Urban Railway Operation Company (MUROC) operates 2 lines with 37.5 kilometers length and 35 stations. Tunnel excavation of line 3 has begun and more than 14 kilometers of tunnel excavation is done using two Tunnel Boring Machines and operation of the first phase of line 3 was expected to start in 2021. Tunnel Excavation of line 4 was going to start in summer 2019.

=== Road ===
Road 95 links Mashhad south to Torbat-e Heydarieh and Birjand. Road 44 goes west towards Shahrud and Tehran. Road 22 travels northwest towards Bojnurd. Ashgabat in Turkmenistan is 220 km away and is accessible via Road 22 (AH78).

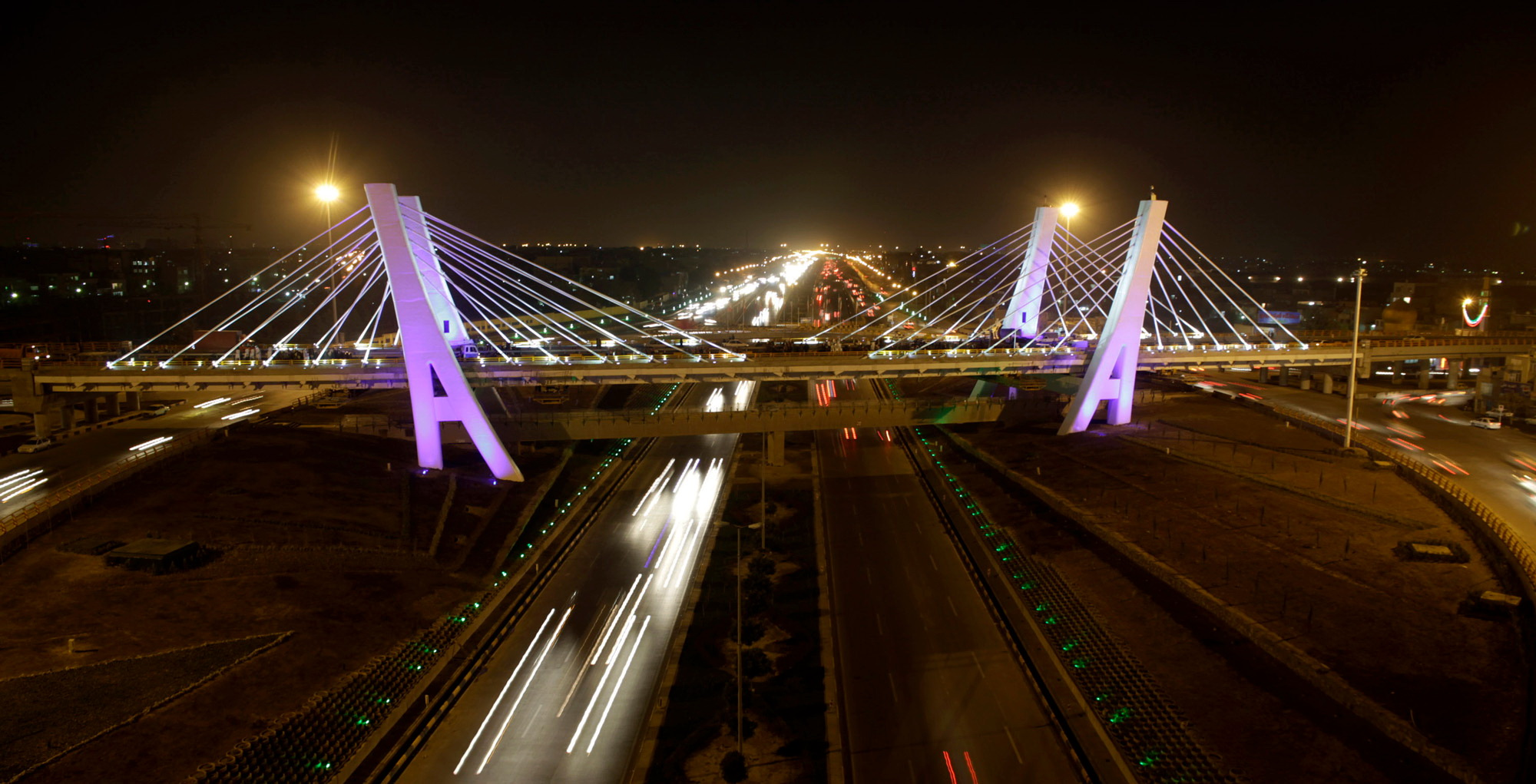
Cable Intersection at Imam Hossein square

=== Bus ===
Mashhad operates a Bus Rapid Transit (BRT) system designed to improve traffic flow and mobility within the city. These lines provide direct transport to the Imam Reza Shrine.

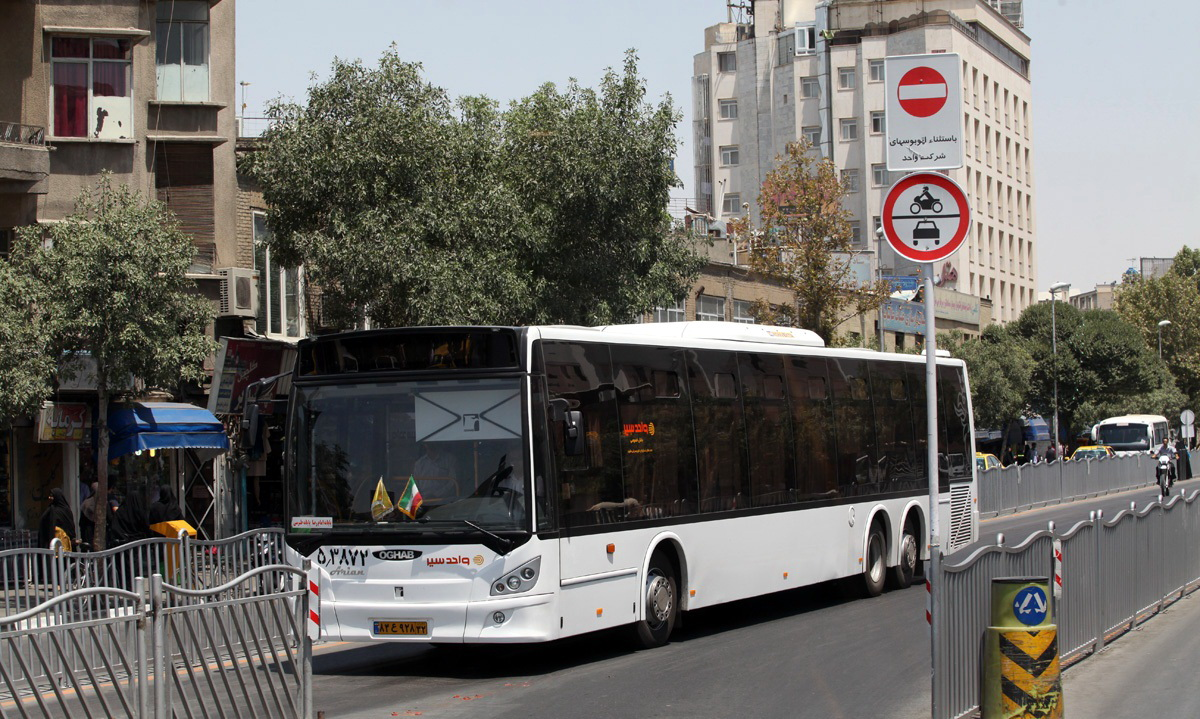
BRT line

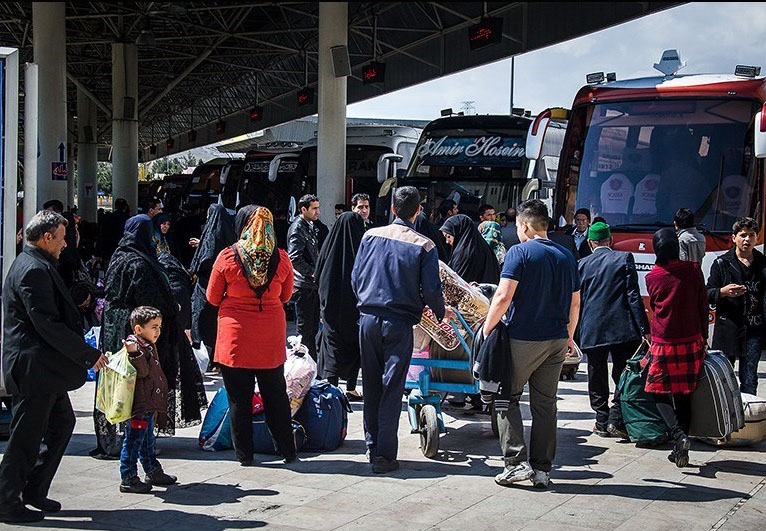
Imam Reza bus terminus

== Government and politics ==
=== Astan Quds ===
Astan Quds which controls the shrine- the tourism driver- is a wealthy tax exempt religious/political organization. It is recommended to reduce poverty in city a Bazaar be opened by poor people in a courtyard.

=== Members of Parliament ===
Mashhad's current members of parliament are described as politicians with fundamentalist conservative tendencies, who are mostly the members of Front of Islamic Revolution Stability, an Iranian principlist political group. They were elected to the Parliament on 26 February 2016.

=== Members of Assembly of Experts ===
Mahmoud Hashemi Shahroudi and Ahmad Alamolhoda are two members of the Iranian Assembly of Experts from Mashhad. Hashemi Shahroudi is currently First Vice-chairman of the Iranian Assembly of Experts. He was the Head of Iran's Judiciary from 1999 until 2009 who upon accepting his position, appointed Saeed Mortazavi, a well known fundamentalist and controversial figure during President Mahmud Ahmadinejad's reelection, prosecutor general of Iran. He was supported by Mashhad's reformists as the candidate of the Fifth Assembly on 26 February 2016.

=== City Council and mayor ===
In 2013, an Iranian principlist political group, Front of Islamic Revolution Stability (which is partly made up of former ministers of Mahmoud Ahmadinejad and Mohammad Taghi Mesbah Yazdi), gained a landslide victory in Mashhad City Council, which on 23 September 2013, elected Seyed Sowlat Mortazavi as mayor, who was former governor of the province of South Khorasan and the city of Birjand. The municipality's budget amounted to 9600 billion Toman in 2015.

== Universities and colleges ==
Universities

- Ferdowsi University of Mashhad
- Ferdowsi University of Mashhad – International Campus
- Golbahar University of Science and New Technology
- Imam Reza International University
- Islamic Azad University of Khorasan – Golbahar International Campus
- Islamic Azad University of Mashhad
- Khayyam University
- Payame Noor University of Mashhad
- Razavi University of Islamic Sciences
- Sama College of Mashhad (Islamic Azad University of Mashhad)
- Sport Sciences Research Institute of Iran

Colleges

- Al Mustafa International University
- Arman Razavi Girls Institute of Higher Education
- Asrar Institute of Higher Education
- Attar Institute of Higher Education
- Bahar Institute of Higher Education
- Binalood Institute of Higher Education
- Cultural Heritage, Hand Crafts, and Tourism Higher Education Center (University of Science and Technology)
- Eqbal Lahoori Institute of Higher Education
- Hakim Toos Institute of Higher Education
- Hekmat Razavi Institute of Higher Education
- Iranian Academic Center for Education, Culture and Research, Mashhad Branch (Jahad Daneshgahi of Mashhad)
- Jahad Keshavarzi Higher Education Center of Khorasan Razavi (Shahid Hashemi Nejad)
- Kavian Institute of Higher Education
- Kharazmi Azad Institute of Higher Education of Khorasan
- Khavaran Institute of Higher Education
- Kheradgarayan Motahar Institute of higher education
- Khorasan Institute of Higher Education
- Khorasan Razavi Judiciary Center (University of Science and Technology)
- Khorasan Razavi Municipalities' Institute of Research, Education, and Consultation of (University of Science and Technology)
- Mashhad Aviation Industry Center (University of Science and Technology)
- Mashhad Aviation Training Center (University of Science and Technology)
- Mashhad Culture and Art Center 1 (University of Science and Technology)
- Mashhad Koran Reciters Society
- Mashhad Prisons Organization Center (University of Science and Technology)
- Mashhad Tax center (University of Science and Technology)
- Navvab Higher Clerical School
- Part Tyre Center (University of Science and Technology)
- Red Crescent Society of Khorasan Razavi (University of Science and Technology)
- Salman Institute of Higher Education
- Samen Teacher Training Center of Mashhad (Farhangian University)
- Samen Training Center of Mashhad (Technical and Vocational University)
- Sanabad Golbahar Institute of Higher Education
- Shahid Beheshti Teacher Training College (Farhangian University)
- Shahid Hashemi Nejad Teacher Training College (Farhangian University)
- Shandiz Institute of Higher Education
- Khorasan Razavi Taavon Center (University of Science and Technology)
- Tabaran Institute of Higher Education
- Toos Institute of Higher Education
- Toos Porcelain Center (University of Science and Technology)
- Khorasan Water and Electricity Industry Center (University of Science and Technology)
- Workers' House; Mashhad Branch (University of Science and Technology)

== Sports ==
Imam Reza Stadium

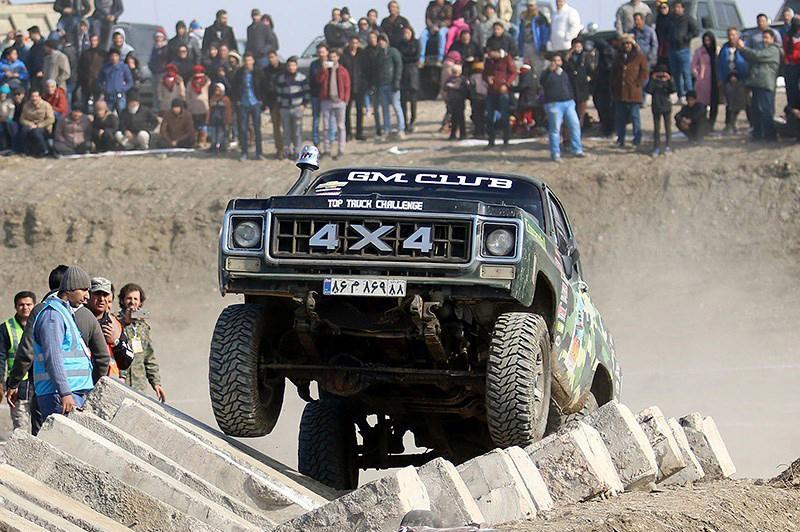
Iran's Offroad Racing Championship - Mashhad

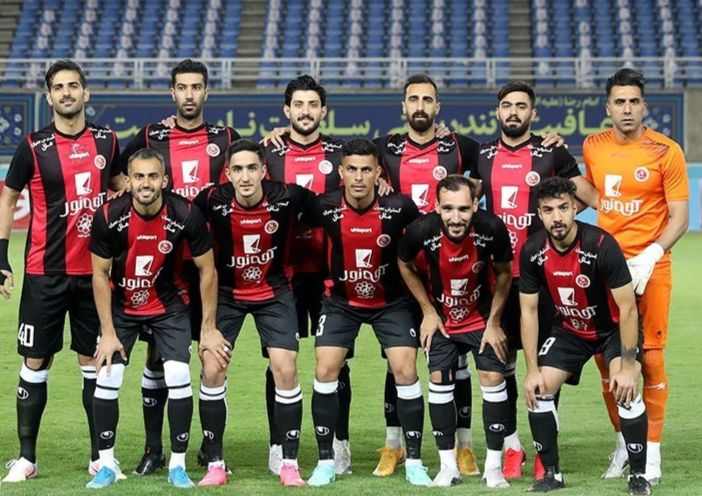
Padideh Khorasan FC

=== Major sport teams ===
Club	League	Sport	Venue	Established
F.C. Aboomoslem	Iran Pro League	Football	Takhti Stadium	1907
Shahr Khodro F.C.	Iran Pro League	Football	Imam Reza Stadium	2007
Siah Jamegan F.C.	Iran Pro League	Football	Takhti Stadium	1970
Samen Mashhad BC	Iranian Basketball Super League	Basketball	Shahid Beheshti Sport Complex	2011
Mizan Khorasan VC	Iranian Volleyball Super League	Volleyball	Shahid Beheshti Sport Complex	2010
Farsh Ara Mashhad FSC	Iranian Futsal Super League	Futsal	Shahid Beheshti Sport Complex	1994
Ferdosi Mashhad FSC	Iranian Futsal Super League	Futsal	Shahid Beheshti Sport Complex	2011
Rahahan Khorasan W.C.	Iranian Premier Wrestling League	Freestyle wrestling	Mohammad Ali Sahraei Hall	1995

=== Other sports ===
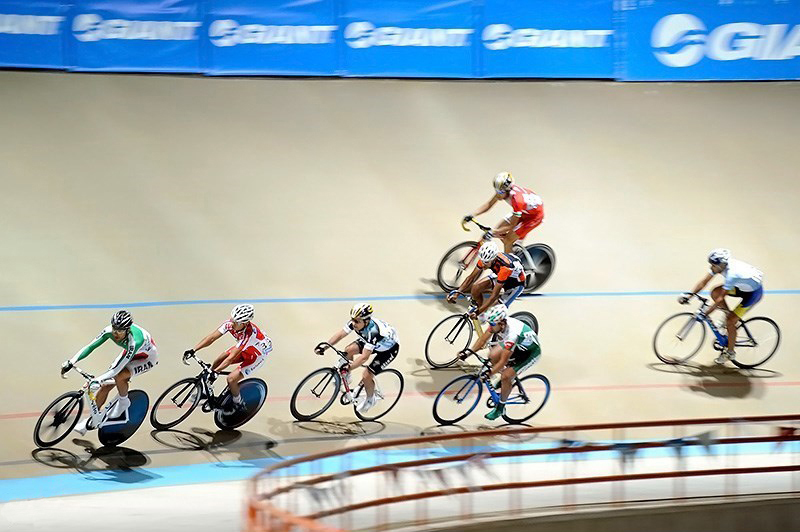
Grand Prix Cycling of Mashhad

City was host to 2009 Junior World Championships in sitting volleyball where Iran's junior team won gold.

Wrestling is a sport in this city. Pahlevani and zoorkhaneh rituals have a special place in Mashhad and is one of the most important zoorkhaneh in Iran in Mashhad.

Mashhad cycling track was introduced in 2011 as the most equipped cycling track in Iran; Car racing track, motorcycle track and motocross track, three skating rinks, ski track and equestrian track in Mashhad are other sports tracks in Mashhad. The first golf course in Iran is located in the Samen complex of Mashhad.

== Mashhad as capital of Iran and independent Khorasan ==
The following Shahanshahs had Mashhad as their capital:

- Kianid Dynasty
- Malek Mahmoud Sistani 1722–1726
- Afsharid dynasty
- Nader Shah
- Adil Shah
- Ebrahim Afshar
- Shahrukh Afshar
- Nadir Mirza of Khorasan
- Safavid dynasty
- Soleyman II
- Autonomous Government of Khorasan

== Notable people from Mashhad and Toos ==
=== Artists ===
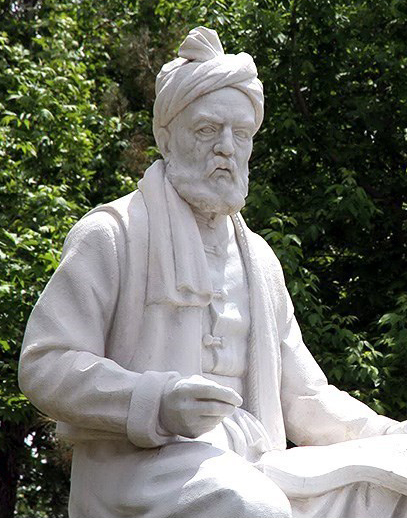
Abolghasem Ferdowsi Pazh, author of one of the world's longest epic poems created by a single poet, and the greatest epic of Persian speaking countries

=== Music ===
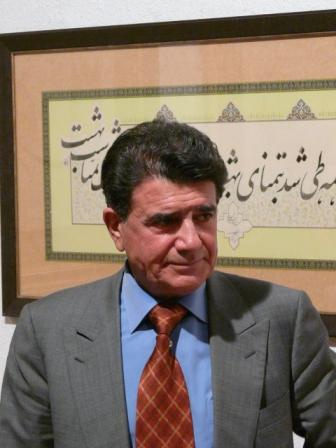
Mohammad-Reza Shajarian (Siyavash Bidgani), singer-songwriter. He received the Picasso Award, UNESCO Mozart Medal, and National Order of Merit (France).

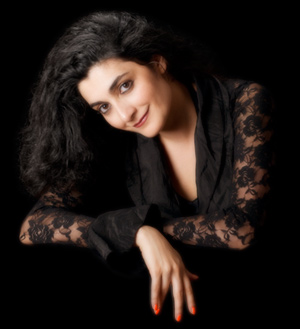
Darya Dadvar, soprano soloist and composer

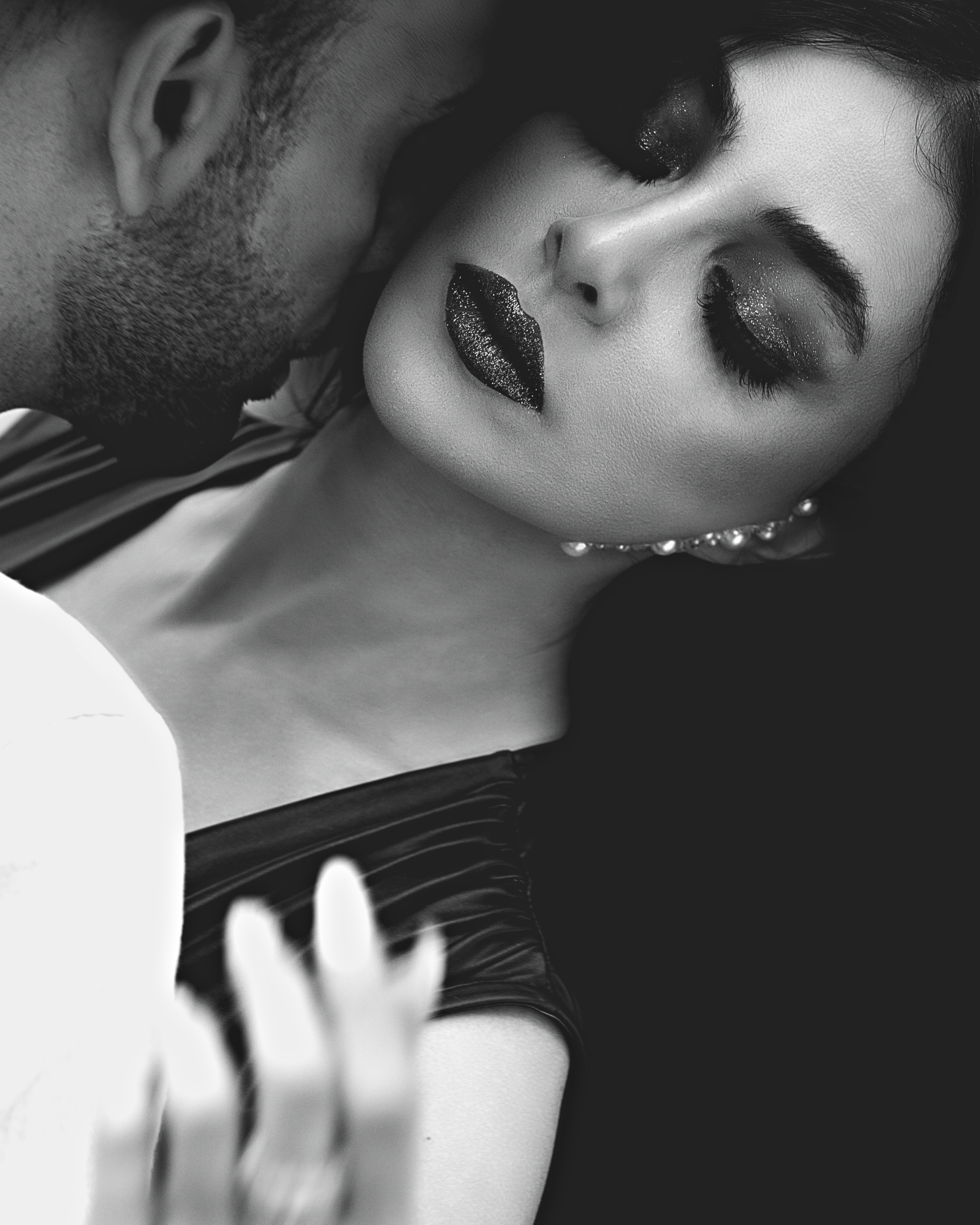
Tamin and A-del in 25 (Toos) band

=== Cinema ===
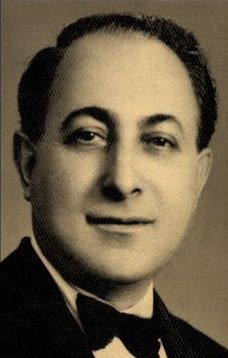
Ovanes Ohanian, Director

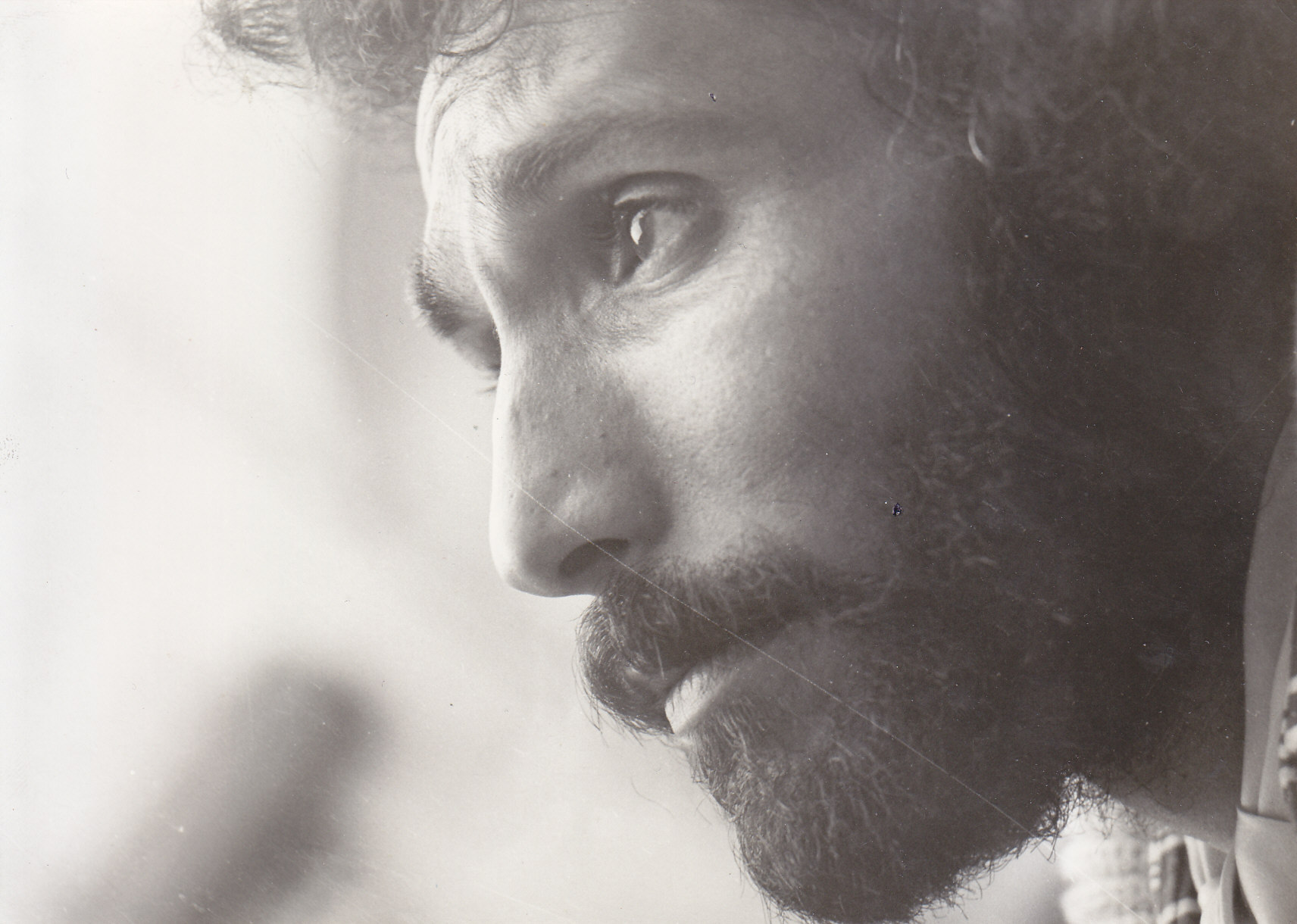
Amir Ghavidel, Art Director

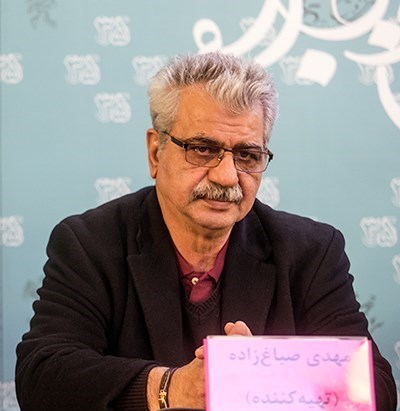
Mehdi Sabbagh zade, Director, screenwriter and producer

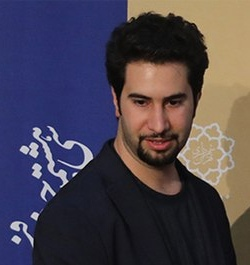
Kourosh Ahari, Director, screenwriter and producer

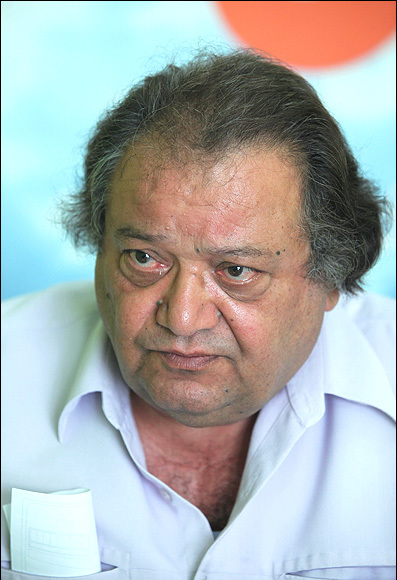
Mohammad Motie, actor

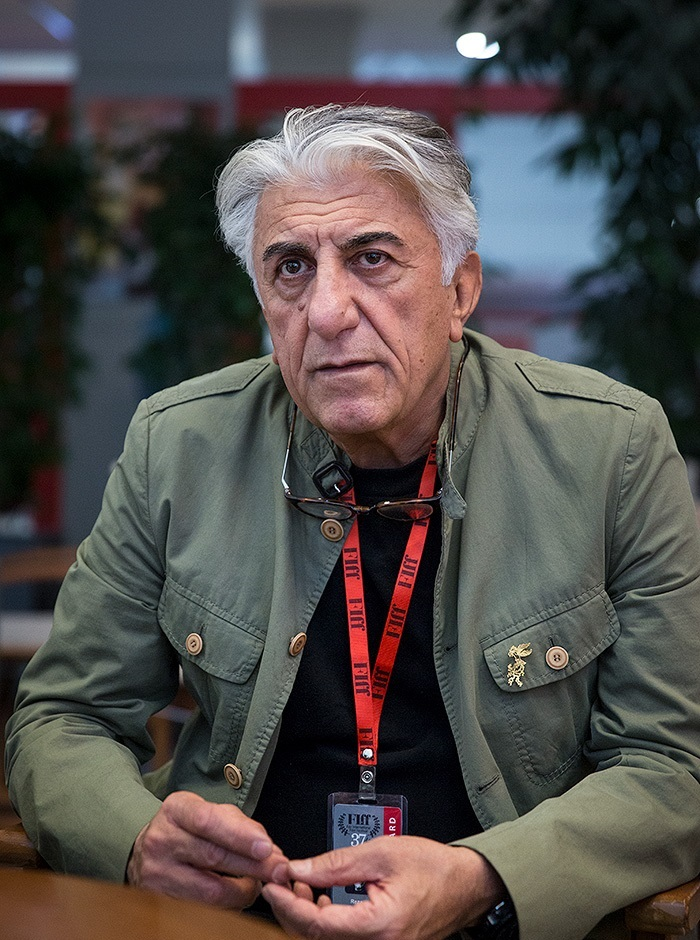
Reza Kianian, actor

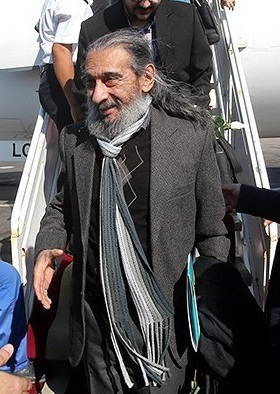
Anoushirvan Arjmand, actor

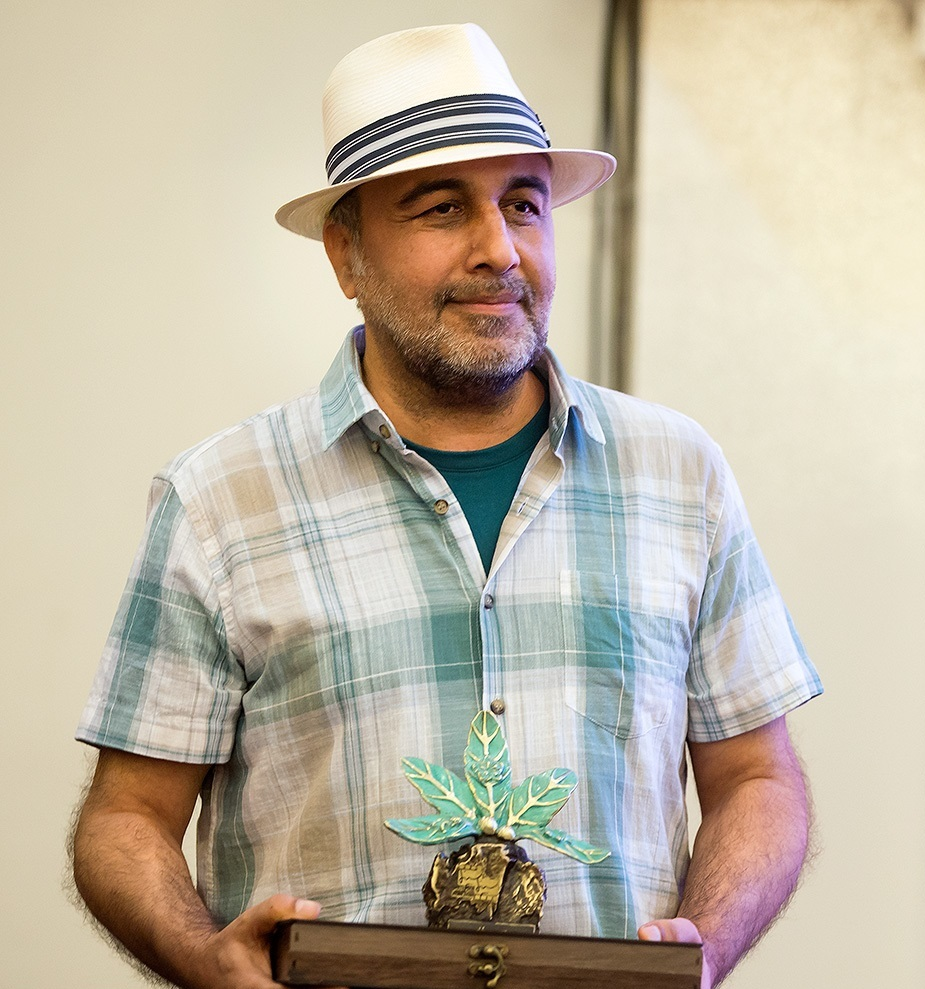
Reza Attaran, actor

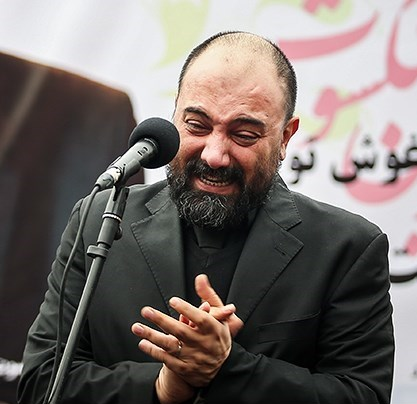
Borzoo Arjmand, actor

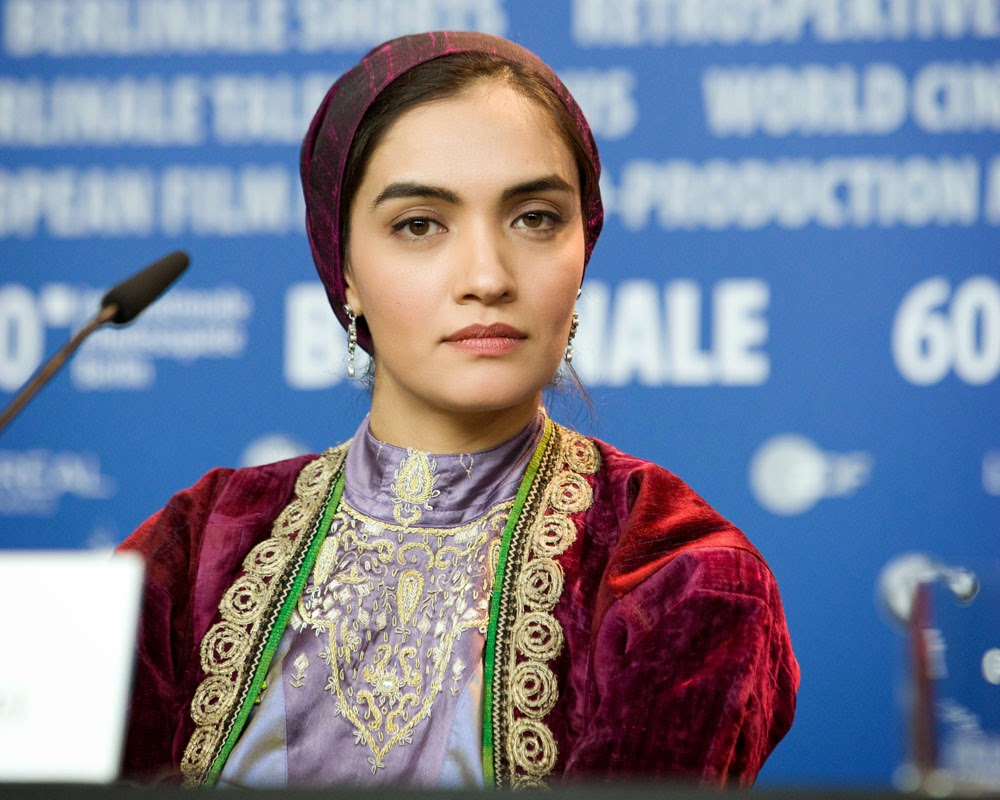
Mitra Hajjar, actress

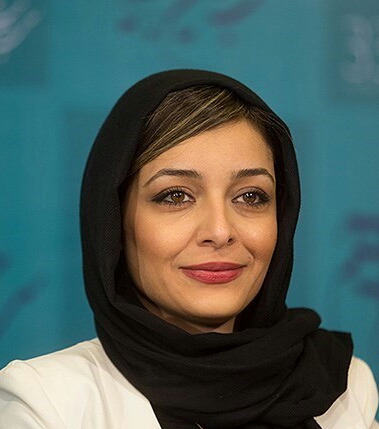
Sare Bayaat, actress

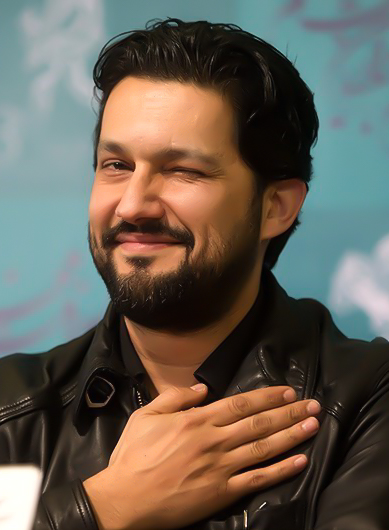
Hamed Behdad, actor

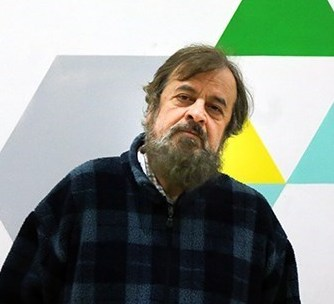
Hamid Reza Sadr, film and football critic and journalist

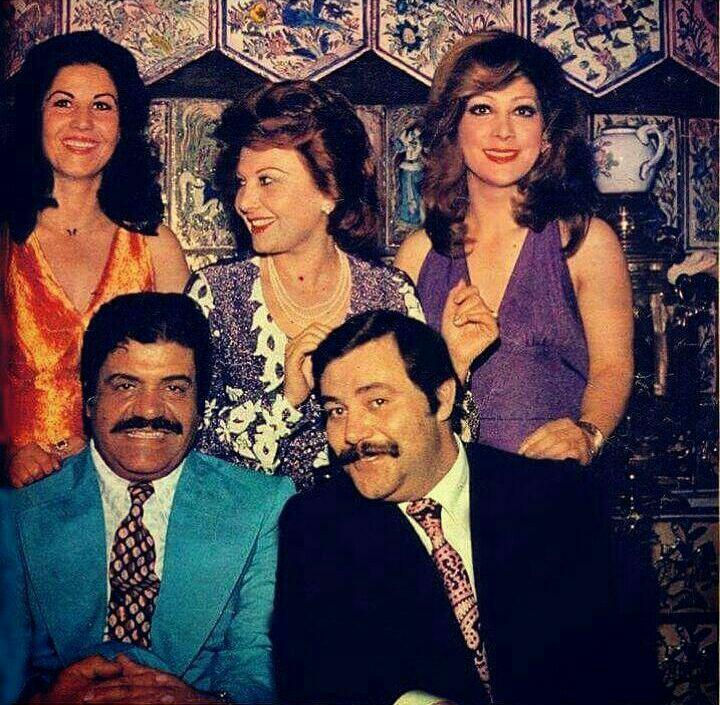
Homayun, actor

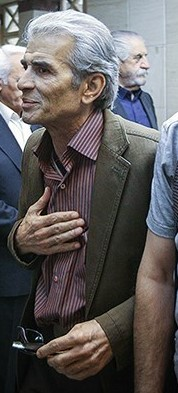
Mohammad Shiri, actor

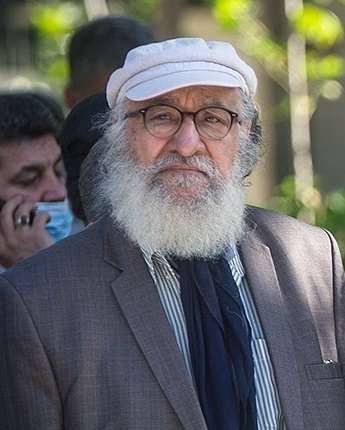
Dariyush Arjmand, actor
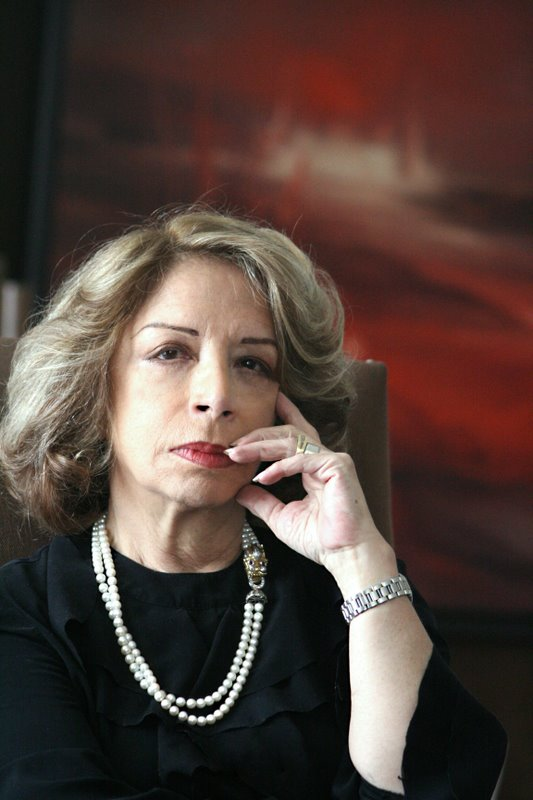
Iran Darroodi, Surreal painter

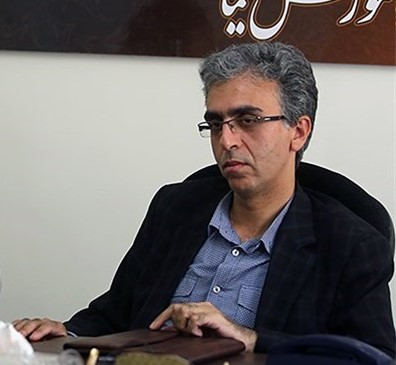
Reza Rafi', poet
- 25band, both singers born in Mashhad; Pop Group formed in 2010
- Abdi Behravanfar, born June 1975 in Mashhad; singer, guitar player and singer-songwriter
- Ali "Dubfire" Shirazinia, born 19 April 1971; musician/dj (co-founder of Deep Dish)
- Amir Ghavidel, March 1947 – November 2009; director and script writer
- Anoushirvan Arjmand, actor
- Dariush Arjmand, actor
- Hamed Behdad, born 17 November 1973 in Mashhad; actor
- Hamid Motebassem, born 1958 in Mashhad; musician and tar and setar player
- Homayoun Shajarian, Mohammad-Reza Shajarian's son, born 21 May 1975; renowned Persian classical music vocalist, as well as a Tombak and Kamancheh player
- Iran Darroudi, born 2 September 1936 in Mashhad; artist
- Javad Jalali, born 30 May 1977 in Mashhad; photographer and cinematographer
- Mahdi Bemani Naeini, born 3 November 1968; film director, cinematographer, TV cameraman and photographer
- Marshall Manesh, born 16 August 1950 in Mashhad; Iranian-American actor
- Mitra Hajjar, born 4 February 1977; actress
- Mohammad-Reza Shajarian, born 23 September 1940 in Mashhad; Persian traditional singer, composer and Master (Ostad) of Persian music
- Mohsen Namjoo, born 1976 in Torbat-e-Jaam; singer-songwriter, author, musician and setar player
- Navid Negahban, born 2 June 1968 in Mashhad; Iranian-American actor
- Noureddin Zarrinkelk, born 1937 in Mashhad; animator, concept artist, editor, graphic designer, illustrator, layout artist, photographer, script writer and sculptor
- Ovanes Ohanian, ?–1961 Tehran; Armenian-Iranian filmmaker who established the first film school in Iran
- Pouran Jinchi, born 1959 in Mashhad; Iranian-American artist
- Rafi Pitts, born 1967 in Mashhad; film director
- Reza Attaran, born 31 March 1968 in Mashhad; actor and director
- Reza Kianian, born 17 July 1951 in Mashhad; actor
- Shahin Ebrahimzadeh-Pezeshki, born 1958 in Mashhad; Persian textile and costume art historian, historian of tribal costumes, textile artist, author, researcher and curator
- Hamed Soltani born Mashhad, Iran is an producer, television presenter, and director.

=== Entrepreneurs ===
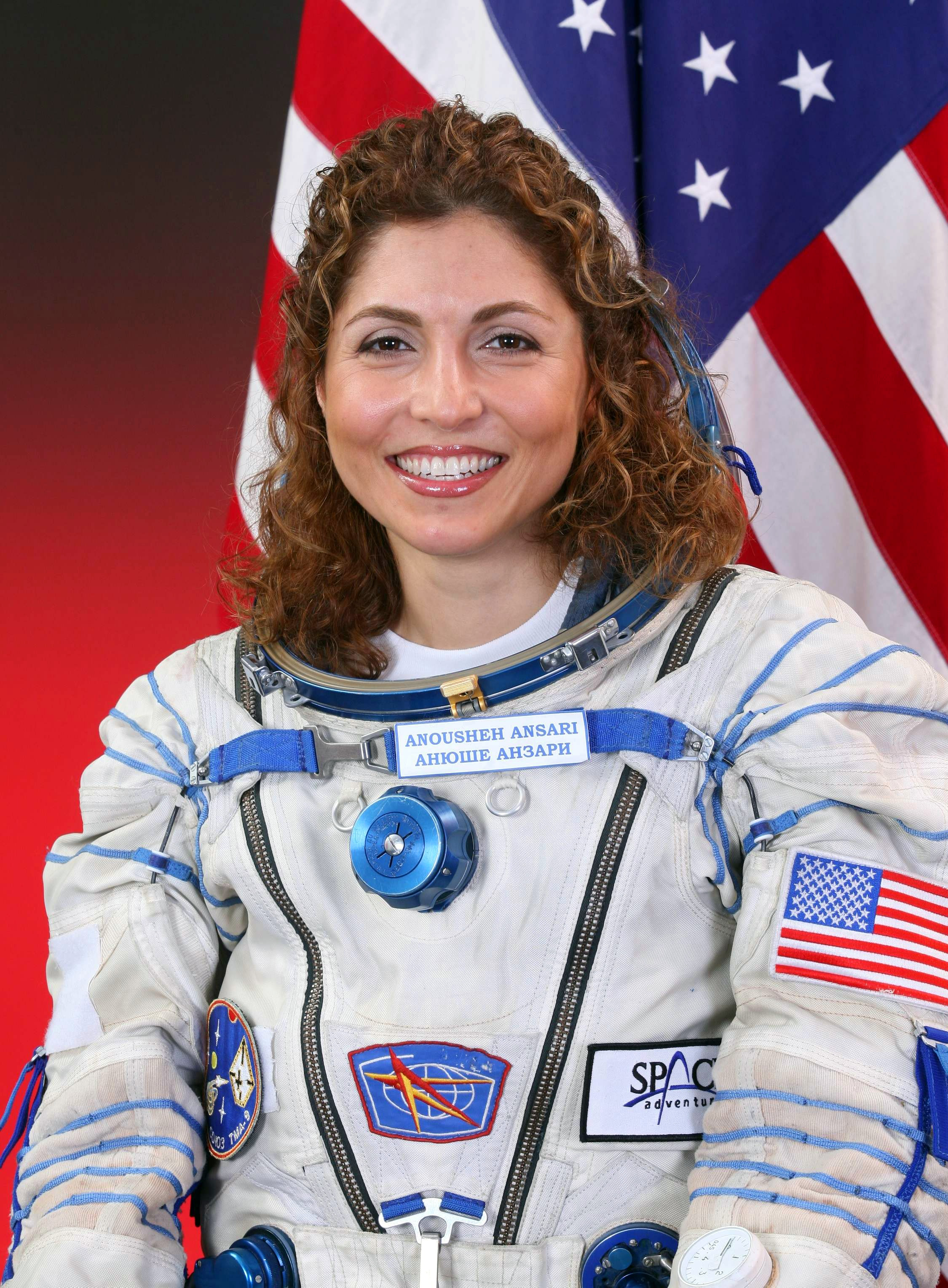
Anousheh Ansari Iranian-American engineer, co-founder and chairman of Prodea Systems, co-founder and CEO of Telecom Technologies, Inc. (TTI), sponsor of the Ansari X Prize
- Anousheh Ansari, born 12 September 1966; the Iranian-American co-founder and chairman of Prodea Systems, Inc., and a spaceflight participant with the Russian space program
- Hossein Sabet, businessman and Persian carpet dealer who owns Sabet International Trading Co.
- Mahmoud Khayami, born 1930 in Mashhad, Iran; Iranian born industrialist and philanthropist, of French nationality

=== Sports ===
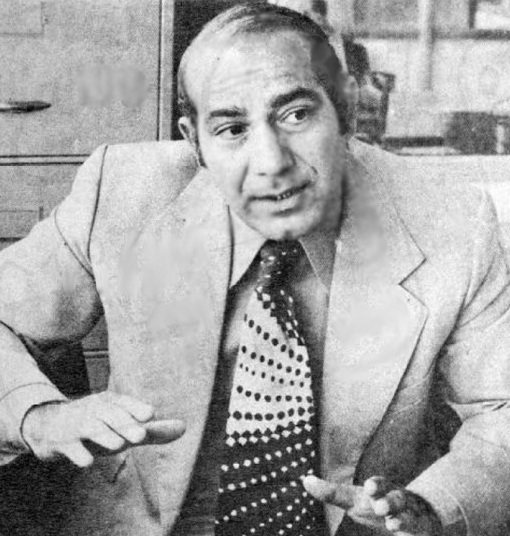
Heshmat Mohajerani, footballer and former football manager

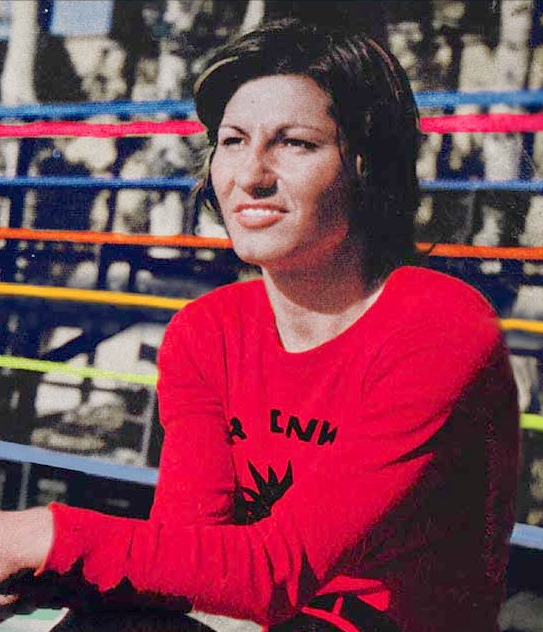
Maryam Sedaarati, athlete

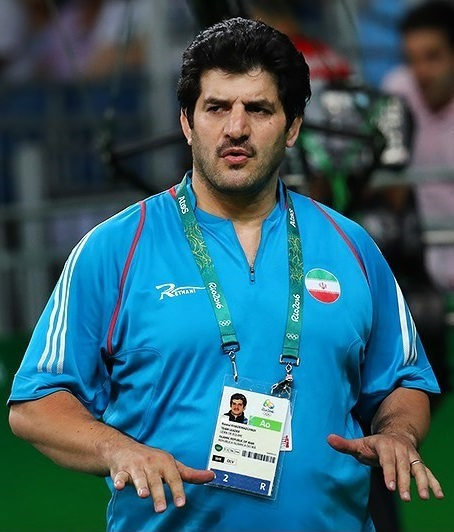
Rasoul Khadem, wrestling coach

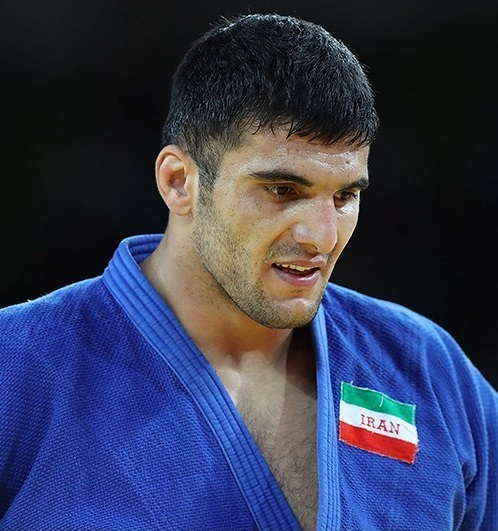
Javad Mahjoob

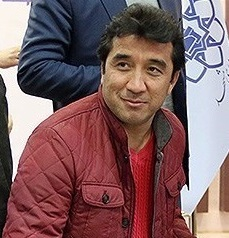
Khodadad Azizi

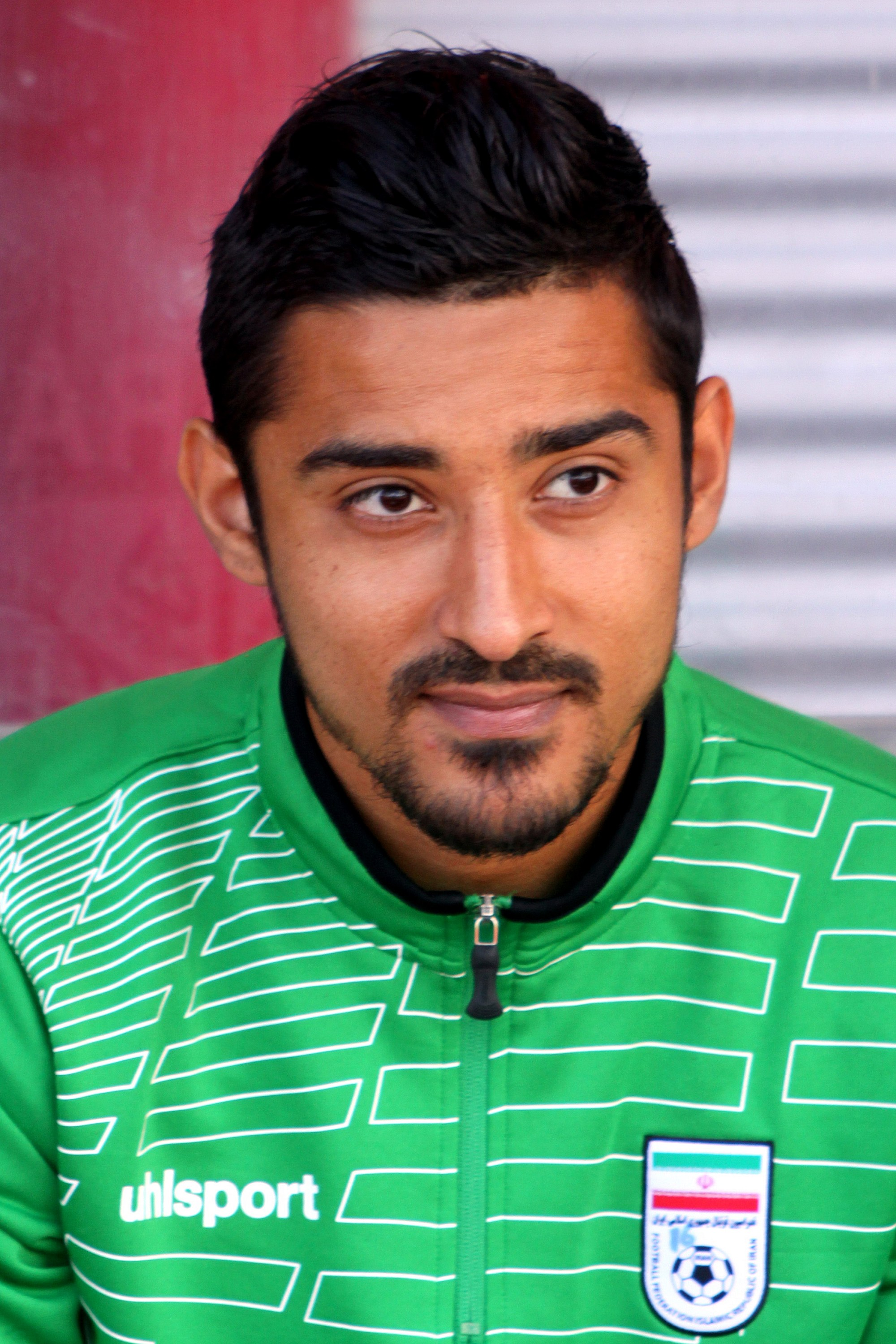
Reza Ghoochannejhad

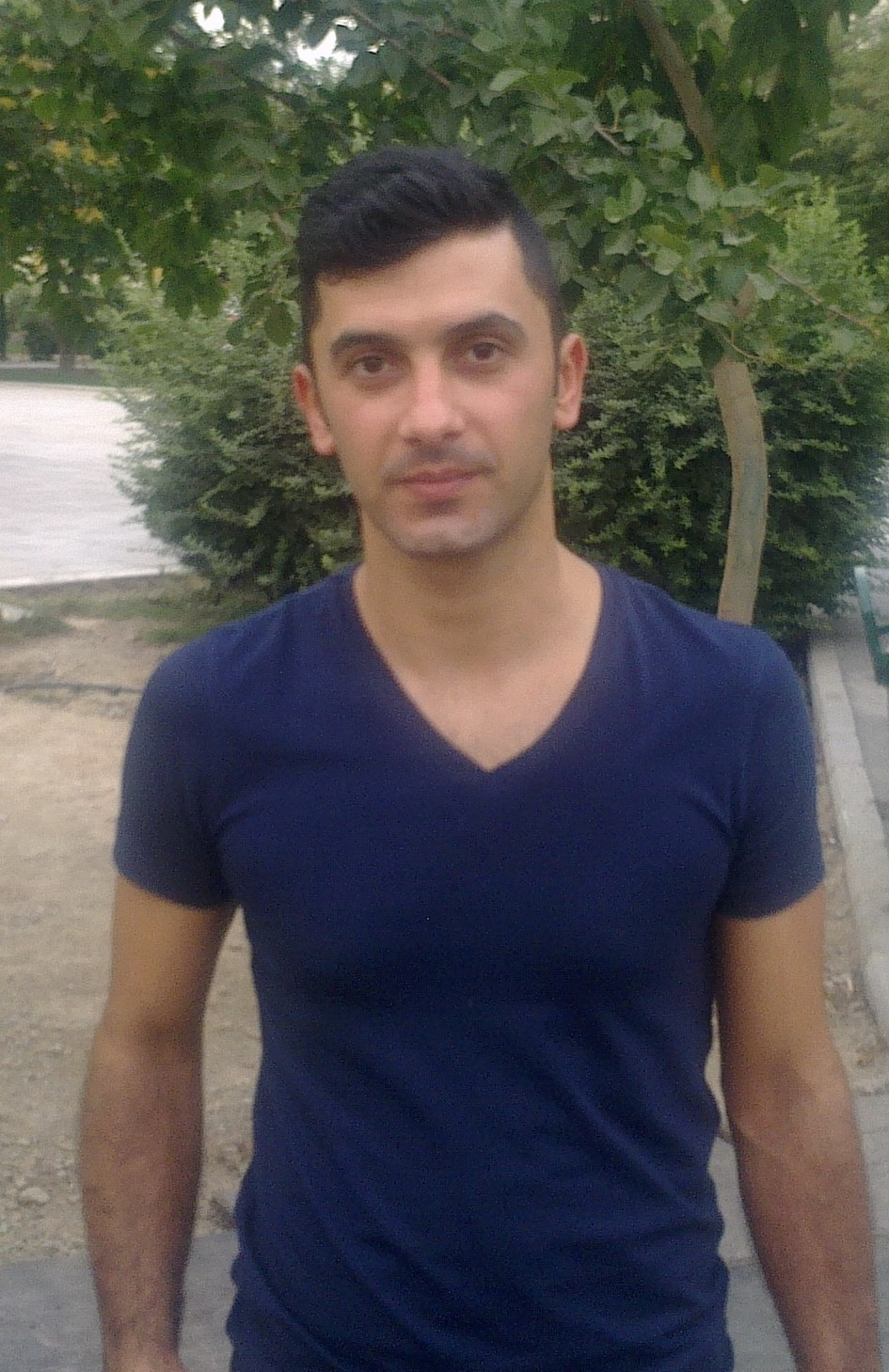
Farhad Zarif, volleyball player
- Abbas Chamanyan, born 10 May 1963 in Mashhad, football coach, manager and former player
- Ali Baghbanbashi, athlete
- Alireza Vahedi Nikbakht, born 30 June 1980 in Mashhad professional football player
- Amir Ghaseminejad, born 11 September 1985 in Mashhad, judoka
- Amir Reza Khadem, born 10 February 1970 in Mashhad, wrestler
- Farhad Zarif, born 3 March 1983, volleyballer
- Ghodrat Bahadori, born 4 February 1990, futsaler/indoor soccer player
- Hamed Afagh, born 1 February 1983, basketballer
- Hamid Reza Mobarez, born 18 February 1981, swimmer
- Heshmat Mohajerani, born January 1936 in Mashhad, Iran; football coach, manager and former player
- Hossein Badamaki, born 13 September 1981, professional football player
- Hossein Tayyebi, futsaler/indoor soccer player
- Javad Mahjoub, judoka
- Khodadad Azizi, born 22 June 1971 in Mashhad, Iran; retired professional football striker
- Kia Zolgharnain, born 10 November 1965, Iranian-American former futsaler/indoor soccer player Kourosh Khani, racing driver
- Mahdi Javid, born 3 May 1987, futsaler/indoor soccer player
- Majid Khodaei, born 26 August 1978, wrestler
- Maryam Sedarati, born 1 June 1950, athlete. Iran record holder in women high jump for three decades.
- Masoud Haji Akhondzadeh, born 29 April 1978, judoka
- Mohammad Khadem, 7 September 1935 – 24 November 2020, wrestler
- Mohammad Mansouri, professional football player
- Mohsen Torki, football referee
- Rasoul Khadem, born 17 February 1972 in Mashhad; wrestler
- Reza Enayati, born 23 September 1976, professional football player
- Reza Ghoochannejhad, born 20 September 1987, Iranian-Dutch professional football player
- Rouzbeh Arghavan, born 18 May 1988, basketballer

=== Religious and political figures ===
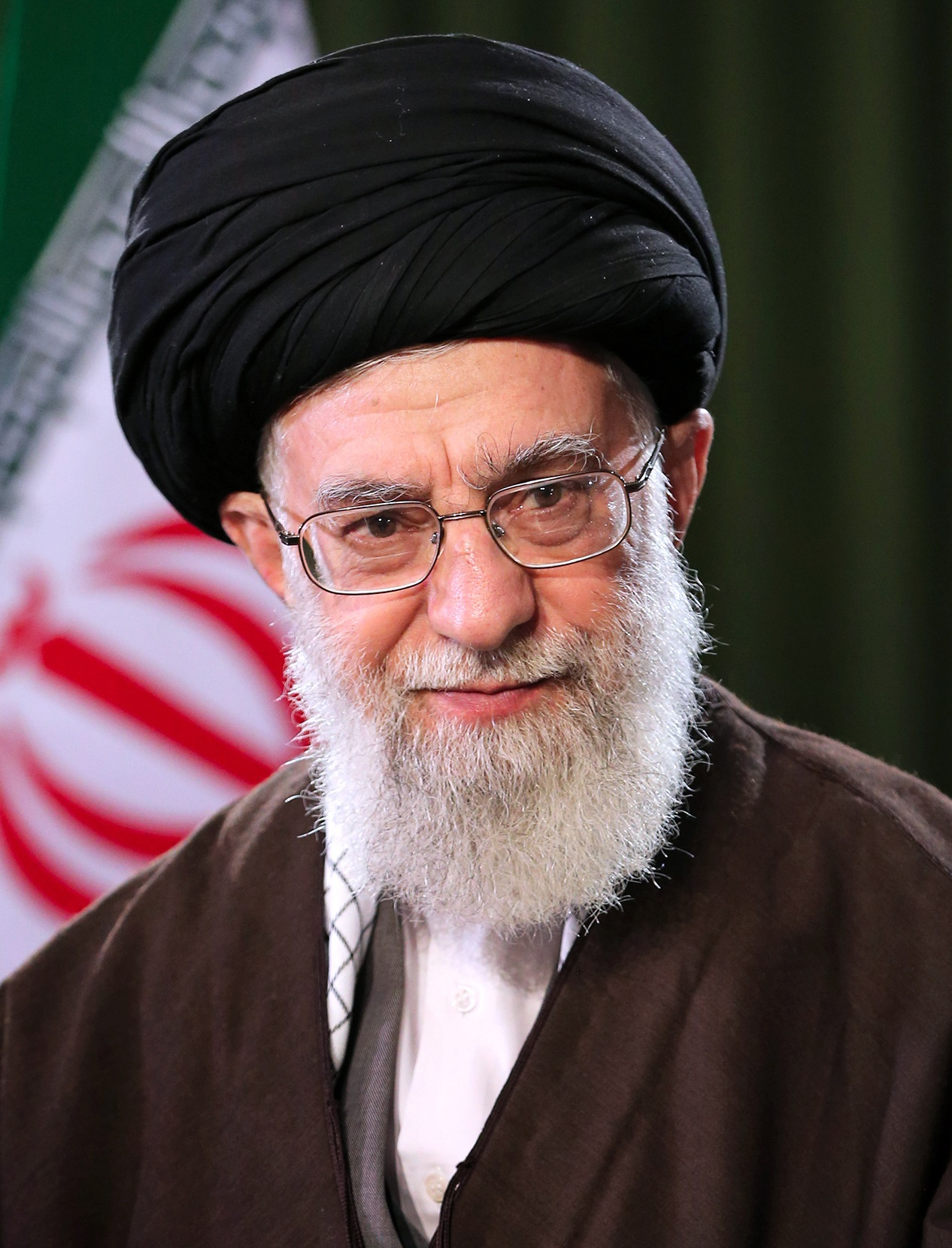
Ali Khamenei, the former supreme leader of Iran

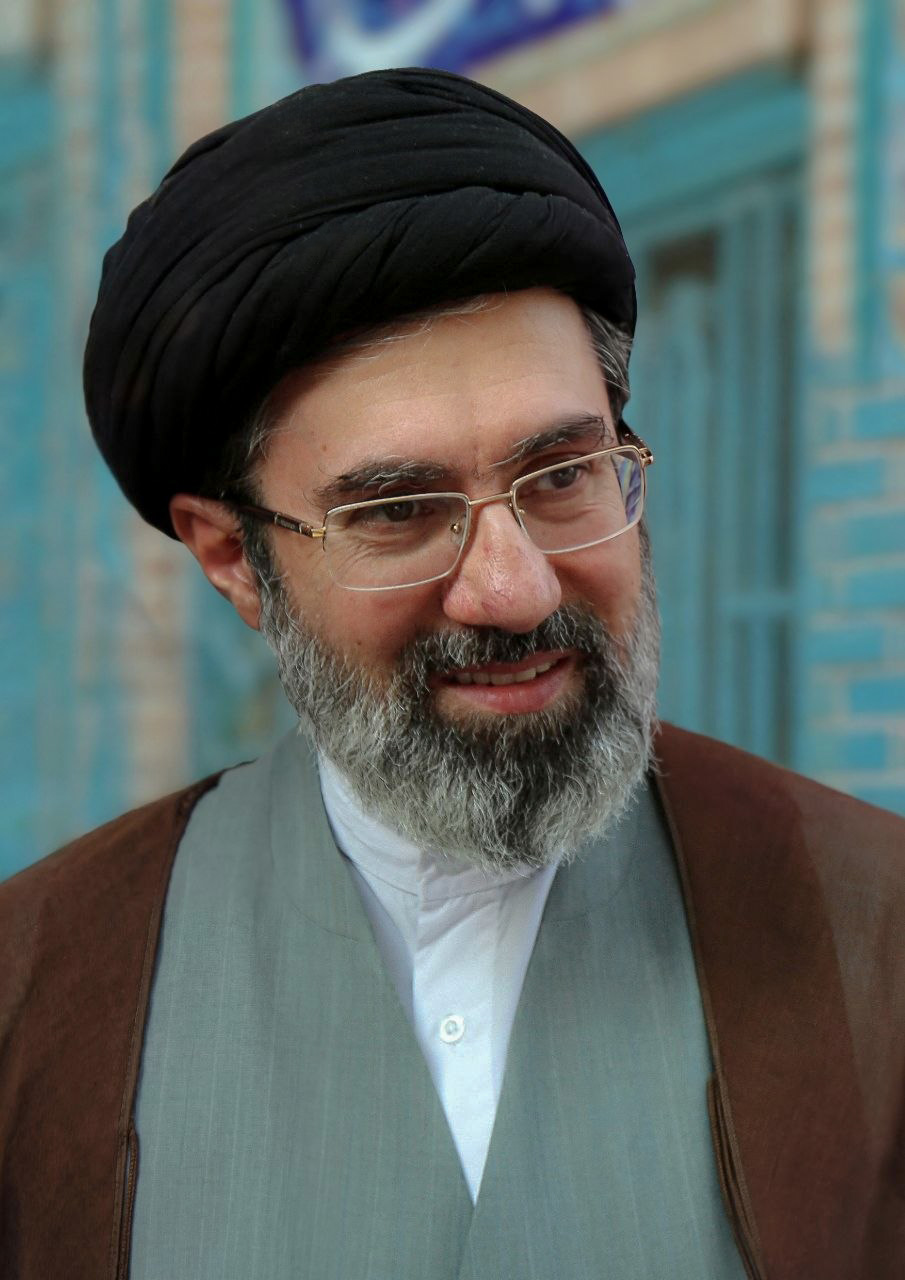
Mojtaba Khamenei, the current supreme leader of Iran

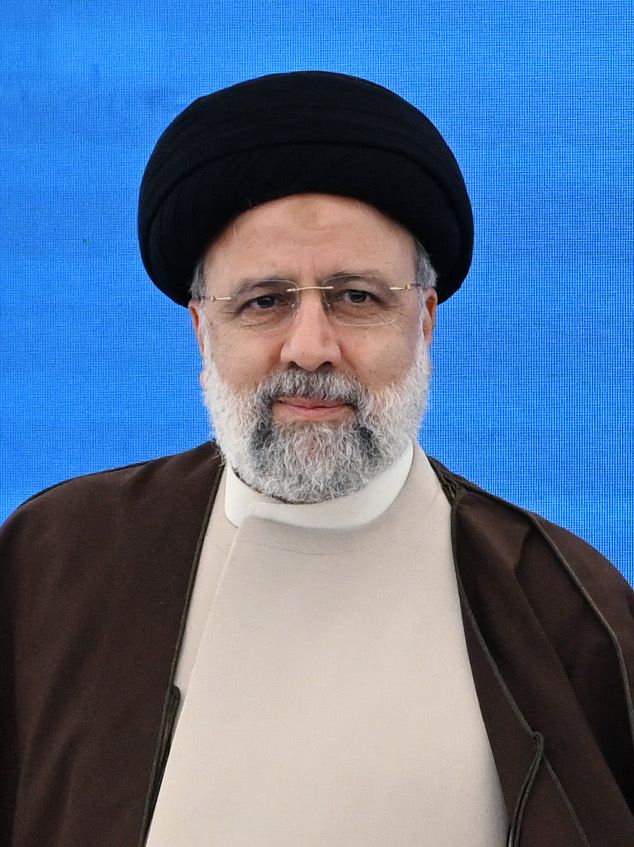
Ebrahim Raisi, the former president of Iran

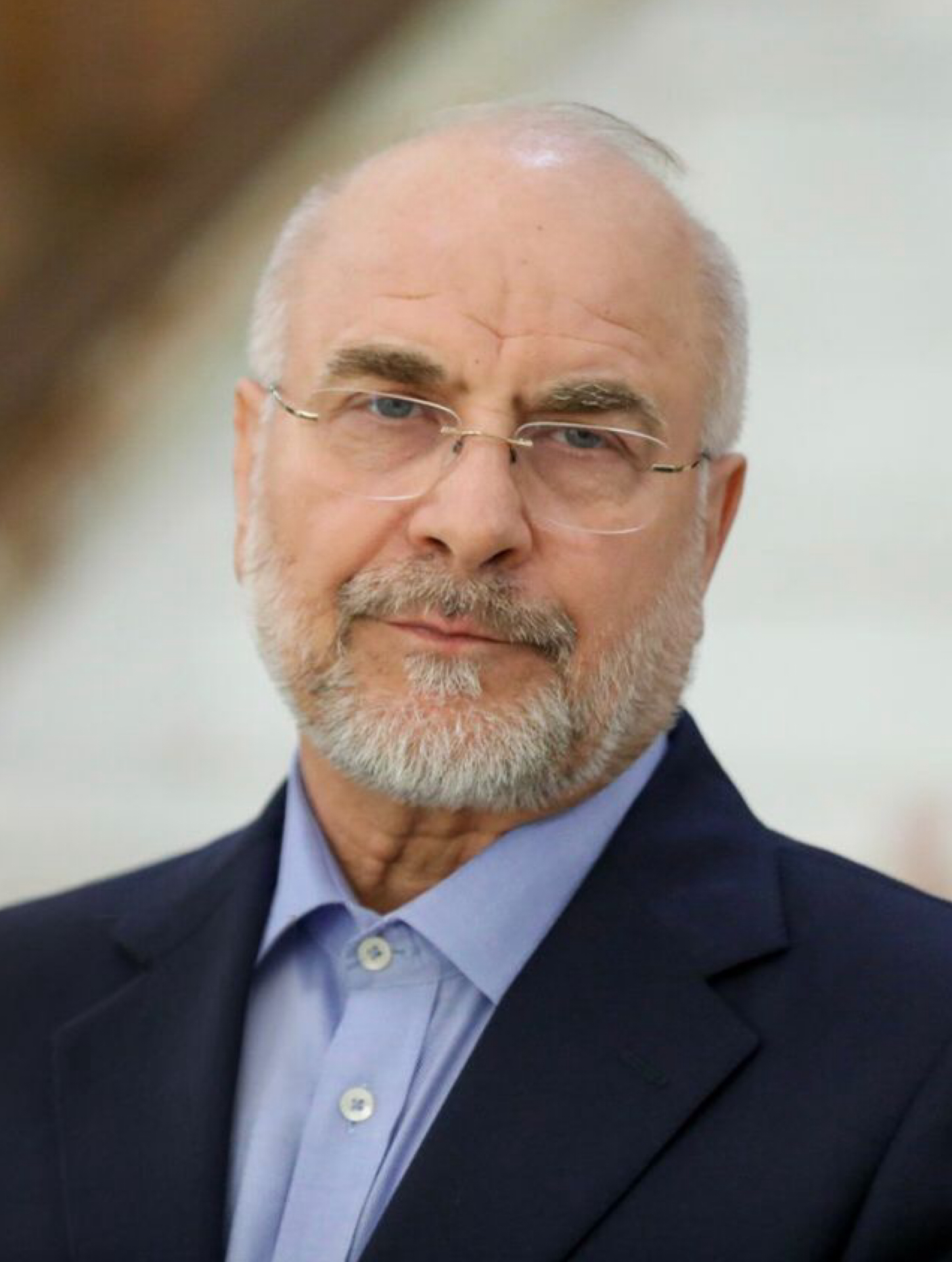
Mohammad Bagher Ghalibaf, the current speaker of the Parliament of Iran

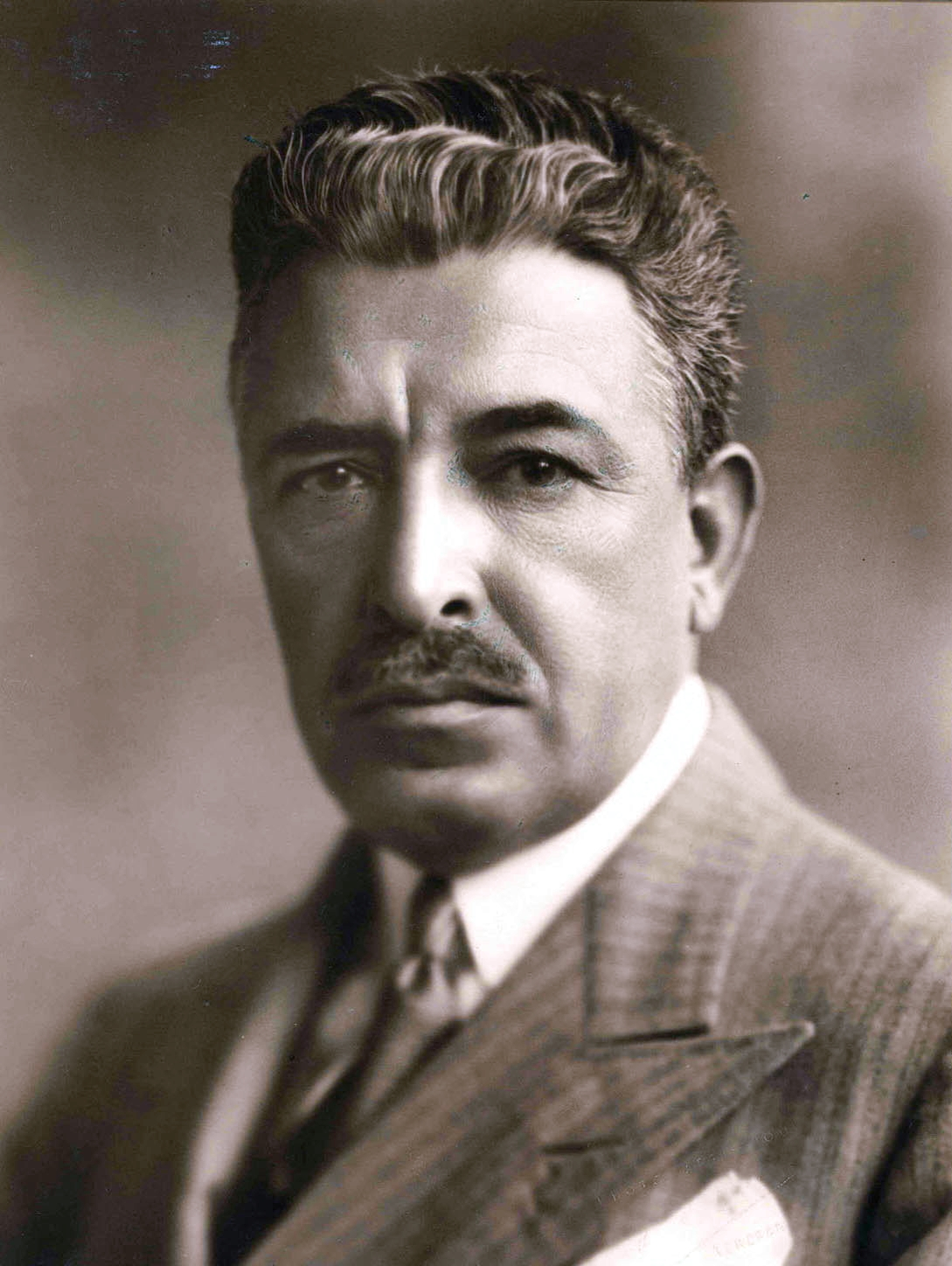
Abdolhossein Teymourtash, the first minister of the royal court of the Pahlavi era
- Al-Hurr al-Aamili, Shia scholar and muhaddith
- Mohammad-Ali Abtahi, born 1958; former Vice President of Iran and a close associate of former reformist President Khatami
- Hassan Rahimpour Azghadi, Conservative political strategist and television personality in the Islamic Republic of Iran
- Mansoureh Khojasteh Bagherzadeh, born 1947; wife of Ali Khamenei
- Goharshad Begum, Persian noble and wife of Shāh Rukh, the emperor of the Timurid dynasty of Herāt
- Manouchehr Eghbal, 1909 – 1977; Prime Minister of Iran
- Abdolreza Rahmani Fazli, born 1959 in Shirvan; Interior Minister of President Hassan Rouhani
- Seyed Hassan Firuzabadi, former major general, Islamic Republic of Iran
- Mohammad Bagher Ghalibaf, born 1961 in Torghabeh, near Mashhad; the former Mayor of Tehran and current Speaker of Parliament
- Al-Ghazali, 1058–1111; Islamic theologian, jurist, philosopher, cosmologist, psychologist and mystic of Persian origin
- Hassan Ghazizadeh Hashemi, born 1959 in Fariman; Minister of Health and Medical Education of President Hassan Rouhani
- Saeed Jalili, born 1965 in Mashhad; Iranian politician and the former present secretary of Iran's Supreme National Security Council
- Abu Muslim Khorasani, c. 700 – 755; Abu Muslim Abd al-Rahman ibn Muslim al-Khorasani, Abbasid general of Persian origin
- Hadi Khamenei, b. 1947; mid-ranking cleric who is a member of the reformist Association of Combatant Clerics
- Hossein Vahid Khorasani, 1921 – 2026; Twelver Shi'a Marja
- Mohammad-Kazem Khorasani, 1839 – 1911; Twelver Shi'a Marja, Persian (Iranian) politician, philosopher and reformer
- Morteza Motahhari, 1919 in Fariman – 1979; cleric, philosopher, lecturer and politician
- Nizam al-Mulk, 1018 – 14 October 1092; celebrated Persian scholar and vizier of the Seljuq Empire
- Seyyed Ali Khamenei, 1939 – 2026; former president and supreme leader of Iran
- Amirteymour Kalali, Iraninan statesman
- Ebrahim Raisi, 1960 – 2024, 8th President of Iran
- Shahrukh (Timurid dynasty), 1377 – 1447; ruler of the eastern portion of the empire established by the Central Asian warlord Timur (Tamerlane)
- Shaykh Tusi, 385 – 460 A.H.; Persian scholar of the Shi'a Twelver Islamic belief
- Sheikh Ali Tehrani, brother-in-law of Seyyed Ali Khamenei, currently living in Iran. He is one of the oppositions of current Iranian government.
- Ali al-Sistani, born approximately August 4, 1930; Twelver Shi'a marja residing in Iraq since 1951
- Abdolhossein Teymourtash, Iraninan statesman and first minister of justice under the Pahlavis
- Nasir al-Din al-Tusi, born 1201 in Tūs, Khorasan – 1274 in al-Kāżimiyyah, near Baghdad; Persian of the Ismaili and subsequently Twelver Shī'ah Islamic belief
- Abbas Vaez-Tabasi, 1935 – 2016; Grand Imam and Chairman of the Astan Quds Razavi board
- Mordechai Zar 1914 – 1982, Mashhad-born Israeli politician

=== Scientists ===
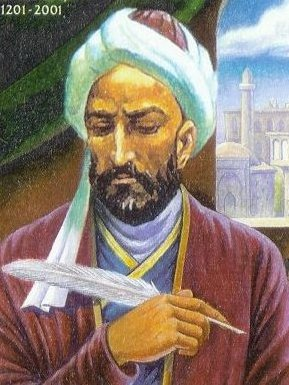
Nasiroddin (Mohammad) Toosi

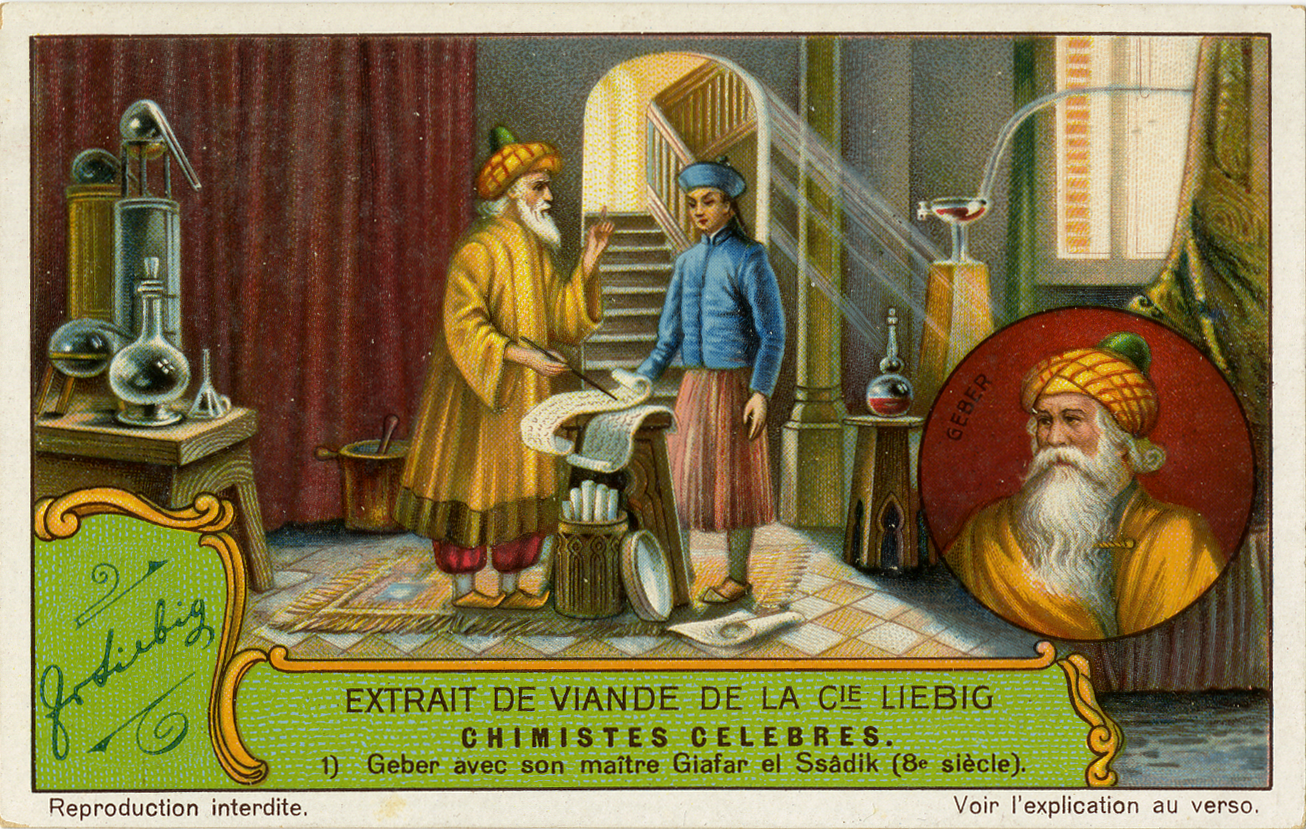
Jaber Toosi
- Abū al-Wafā' Būzjānī, 10 June 940 – 1 July 998; Persian mathematician and astronomer
- Abū Ja'far al-Khāzin, 900–971; Persian astronomer and mathematician from Khorasan
- Jābir ibn Hayyān, c. 721 in Tus – c. 815 in Kufa; [polymath]], a chemist and alchemist, astronomer and astrologer, engineer, geographer, philosopher, physicist and pharmacist and physician
- Nasir al-Din al-Tusi, born February 1201 in Tūs, Khorasan – 26 June 1274 in al-Kāżimiyyah near Baghdad; Persian of the Ismaili and subsequently Twelver Shī'ah Islamic belief
- Sharaf al-Dīn al-Ṭūsī, 1135–1213; Persian mathematician and astronomer of the Islamic Golden Age (during the Middle Ages)

=== Academics ===
- Fatemeh Shams (born 1983), teaching Persian literature at the University of Pennsylvania and at Oxford University, lives in the United States

=== Writers ===
- Abusa'id Abolkhayr (967 –1049) / Muharram ul Haram 1, 357 – Sha'aban 4, 440 AH; Persian Sufi who contributed to the evolution of Sufi tradition
- Mehdi Akhavan-Sales (1928–1990); Persian poet
- Anvari (1126–1189); Persian poet
- Mohammad-Taghi Bahar (1884–1951), poet
- Abolfazl Beyhaqi (995–1077); Persian historian and author
- Abu-Mansur Daqiqi (935/942–976/980), poet
- Ali Akbar Fayyaz, historian of early Islam and literary critic, founder of the School of Letters and Humanities at the Ferdowsi University of Mashhad
- Ferdowsi (935–1020); Persian poet
- Mohammad Mokhtari (1942–1998), writer who was murdered on the outskirts of Tehran in the course of the Chain Murders of Iran
- Shahram Shiva, author, writer, poet, recording artist, and translator of the works of Rumi; lives in New York
- Asadi Tusi (born in Tus, Iranian province of Khorasan, died in 1072) ; Persian poet of Iranian national epics

=== Other ===
- Yocheved Kashi (1929-2022), Mashad-born Israeli first woman paratrooper in the Israel Defense Forces
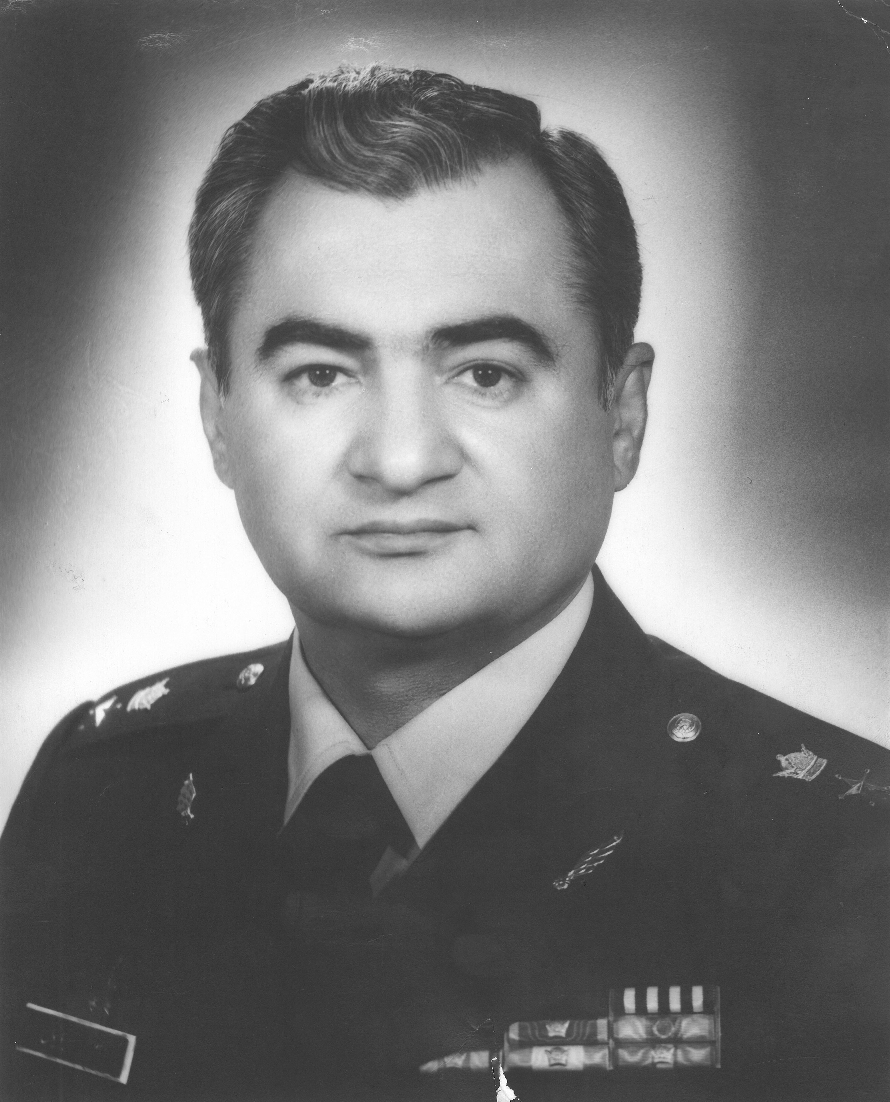
Asghar Imanian, fighter pilot

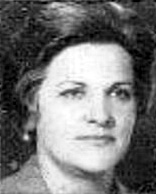
Pari Mohammadzade Omid, Heavy vehicle driver

== Twin towns – sister cities ==
Mashhad is twinned with:

- Karachi, Pakistan
- Karbala, Iraq
- Kuala Lumpur, Malaysia
- Lahore, Pakistan
- Najaf, Iraq
- Ürümqi, China

== Consulates ==
=== Active ===
- Kyrgyzstan (1996–)
- Pakistan (1975–)
- Turkey (1919–?,1930–?, 2014–)
- Turkmenistan (1995–)

=== Former ===
- United Kingdom (1889–1975)
- Russia (1889–1917)
- USSR (1917–1937, 1941–1979)
- China (1941–?)
- United States (1949–1979)
- Poland
- India
- Japan
- Jordan
- Lebanon
- West Germany (c. 1984)
- Kazakhstan (1995–2009)
- Saudi Arabia (2004–2016)

== See also ==
- The National Library of Astan Quds Razavi
- Mashadi Jewish Community
- Sport Sciences Research Institute of Iran

Media related to Mashhad at Wikimedia Commons

Mashhad travel guide from Wikivoyage

== Sources ==
- Glazebrook, Diana; Abbasi-Shavazi, Mohammad Jalal (2007), "Being Neighbors to Imam Reza: Pilgrimage Practices and Return, Iran", Iranian Studies, 40 (2): 187–201, doi:10.1080/00210860701269535, S2CID 162335732
- Zabeth, Hyder Reza (1999). Landmarks of Mashhad. Mashhad, Iran: Islamic Research Foundation. ISBN 964-444-221-0.

Preceded by Isfahan	Capital of Iran (Persia); 1736–1747	Succeeded by Shiraz
Preceded by -	Capital of Afsharid dynasty 1736–1796	Succeeded by -
