= List of IEC standards =

The International Electrotechnical Commission (IEC; French: Commission électrotechnique internationale) is an international standards organization that prepares and publishes international standards for all electrical, electronic and related technologies. IEC standards cover a vast range of technologies within electrotechnology.

The numbers of older IEC standards were converted in 1997 by adding 60000; for example IEC 27 became IEC 60027. IEC standards often have multiple sub-part documents; only the main title for the standard is listed here.

- IEC 60027 Letter symbols to be used in electrical technology
- IEC 60028 International standard of resistance for copper
- IEC 60034 Rotating electrical machines
- IEC 60038 IEC Standard Voltages
- IEC 60041 Field acceptance tests to determine the hydraulic performance of hydraulic turbines, storage pumps and pump-turbines
- IEC 60044 Instrument transformers
- IEC 60045 Steam turbines
- IEC 60050 International Electrotechnical Vocabulary
- IEC 60051 Direct acting indicating analogue electrical measuring instruments and their accessories
- IEC 60052 Voltage measurement by means of standard air gaps
- IEC 60055 Paper-insulated metal-sheathed cables for rated voltages up to 18/30 kV (with copper or aluminium conductors and excluding gas-pressure and oil-filled cables)
- IEC 60059 IEC standard current ratings
- IEC 60060 High-voltage test techniques
- IEC 60061 Lamp caps and holders together with gauges for the control of interchangeability and safety
- IEC 60062 Marking codes for resistors and capacitors
- IEC 60063 Preferred number series for resistors and capacitors
- IEC 60064 Tungsten filament lamps for domestic and similar general lighting purposes – Performance requirements
- IEC 60065 Audio, video and similar electronic apparatus – Safety requirements
- IEC 60067 Dimensions of electronic tubes and valves
- IEC 60068 Environmental testing
- IEC 60071 Insulation co-ordination
- IEC 60072 Dimensions and output series for rotating electrical machines
- IEC 60073 Basic and safety principles for man-machine interface, marking and identification – Coding principles for indicators and actuators
- IEC 60076 Power transformers
- IEC 60077 Railway applications – Electric equipment for rolling stock
- IEC 60079 Explosive atmospheres
- IEC 60081 Double-capped fluorescent lamps – Performance specifications
- IEC 60083 Plugs and socket-outlets for domestic and similar general use standardized in member countries of IEC
- IEC 60085 Electrical insulation – Thermal evaluation and designation
- IEC 60086 Primary batteries;
- IEC 60092 Electrical installations in ships
- IEC 60094 Magnetic tape sound recording and reproducing systems
- IEC 60095 Lead-acid starter batteries
- IEC 60096 Radio frequency cables
- IEC 60098 Rumble measurement on Vinyl Disc Turntables
- IEC 60099 Surge arresters
- IEC 60100 Methods for the measurement of direct inter-electrode capacitance of electronic tubes and valves
- IEC 60104 Aluminium-magnesium-silicon alloy wire for overhead line conductors
- IEC 60105 Recommendation for commercial-purity aluminium busbar material
- IEC 60107 Methods of measurement on receivers for television broadcast transmissions
- IEC 60110 Power capacitors for induction heating installations
- IEC 60112 Method for the determination of the proof and the comparative tracking indices of solid insulating materials
- IEC 60114 Recommendation for heat-treated aluminium alloy busbar material of the aluminium-magnesium-silicon type
- IEC 60115 Fixed resistors for use in electronic equipment
- IEC 60118 Electroacoustics – Hearing aids
- IEC 60119 The Electrical Performance of Semiconductor Rectifiers (Metal Rectifiers) (withdrawn)
- IEC 60120 Dimensions of ball and socket couplings of string insulator units
- IEC 60121 Recommendation for commercial annealed aluminium electrical conductor wire
- IEC 60122 Quartz crystal units of assessed quality
- IEC 60127 Miniature fuses
- IEC 60130 Connectors for frequencies below 3 MHz
- IEC 60134 Rating systems for electronic tubes and valves and analogous semiconductor devices
- IEC 60135 Numbering of electrodes and designation of units in electronic tubes and valves
- IEC 60136 Dimensions of brushes and brush-holders for electrical machinery
- IEC 60137 Insulated bushings for alternating voltages above 1000 V
- IEC 60139 Preparation of outline drawings for cathode-ray tubes, their components, connections and gauges
- IEC 60141 Tests on oil-filled and gas-pressure cables and their accessories
- IEC 60143 Series capacitors for power systems
- IEC 60146 Semiconductor converters – General requirements and line commutated converters
- IEC 60151 Measurements of the electrical properties of electronic tubes and valves
- IEC 60152 Identification by hour numbers of the phase conductors of 3-phase electric systems
- IEC 60153 Hollow metallic waveguides
- IEC 60154 Flanges for waveguides
- IEC 60155 Glow-starters for fluorescent lamps
- IEC 60156 Insulating liquids – Determination of the breakdown voltage at power frequency
- IEC 60168 Tests on indoor and outdoor post insulators of ceramic material or glass for systems with nominal voltages greater than 1000 V
- IEC 60169 Radio frequency connectors
- IEC 60172 Test procedure for the determination of the temperature index of enamelled and tape wrapped winding wires
- IEC 60183 Guidance for the selection of high-voltage A.C. cable systems
- IEC 60188 High-pressure mercury vapour lamps – Performance specifications
- IEC 60189 Low-frequency cables and wires with PVC insulation and PVC sheath
- IEC 60191 Mechanical standardization of semiconductor devices
- IEC 60192 Low-pressure sodium vapour lamps – Performance specifications
- IEC 60193 Hydraulic turbines, storage pumps and pump-turbines – Model acceptance tests
- IEC 60194 Printed board design, manufacture and assembly – Terms and definitions
- IEC 60195 Method of measurement of current noise generated in fixed resistors
- IEC 60196 IEC standard frequencies
- IEC 60197 High-voltage connecting wire with flame retarding insulation for use in television receivers
- IEC 60204 Safety of machinery – Electrical equipment of machines
- IEC 60205 Calculation of the effective parameters of magnetic piece parts
- IEC 60211 Maximum demand indicators, Class 1.0
- IEC 60212 Standard conditions for use prior to and during the testing of solid electrical insulating materials
- IEC 60214 Tap-changers
- IEC 60215 Safety requirements for radio transmitting equipment
- IEC 60216 Electrical insulating materials – Thermal endurance properties
- IEC 60227 Polyvinyl chloride insulated cables of rated voltages up to and including 450/750 V
- IEC 60228 Conductors of insulated cables
- IEC 60229 Electric cables – Tests on extruded over-sheaths with a special protective function
- IEC 60230 Impulse tests on cables and their accessories
- IEC 60231 General principles of nuclear reactor instrumentation
- IEC 60233 Tests on Hollow Insulators for use in Electrical Equipment (withdrawn)
- IEC 60235 Measurement of the electrical properties of microwave tubes
- IEC 60236 Methods for the designation of electrostatic deflecting electrodes of cathode-ray tubes
- IEC 60238 Edison screw lampholders
- IEC 60239 Graphite electrodes for electric arc furnaces – Dimensions and designation
- IEC 60240 Characteristics of electric infra-red emitters for industrial heating
- IEC 60243 Electric strength of insulating materials
- IEC 60244 Methods of measurement for radio transmitters
- IEC 60245 Rubber insulated cables – Rated voltages up to and including 450/750 V
- IEC 60246 Connecting wires having a rated voltage of 20 kV and 25 kV d.c. and a maximum working temperature of 105 °C for use in television receivers
- IEC 60247 Insulating liquids – Measurement of relative permittivity, dielectric dissipation factor (tan d) and d.c. resistivity
- IEC 60250 Recommended methods for the determination of the permittivity and dielectric dissipation factor of electrical insulating materials at power, audio and radio frequencies including metre wavelengths
- IEC 60252 AC motor capacitors
- IEC 60254 Lead-acid traction batteries
- IEC 60255 Measuring relays and protection equipment
- IEC 60258 Direct acting recording electrical measuring instruments and their accessories
- IEC 60261 Sealing test for pressurized waveguide tubing and assemblies
- IEC 60263 Scales and sizes for plotting frequency characteristics and polar diagrams
- IEC 60264 Packaging of winding wires
- IEC 60268 Sound system equipment
- IEC 60269 Low-voltage fuses
- IEC 60270 High-voltage test techniques – Partial discharge measurements
- IEC 60273 Characteristic of indoor and outdoor post insulators for systems with nominal voltages greater than 1000 V
- IEC 60276 Definitions and nomenclature for carbon brushes, brush-holders, commutators and slip-rings
- IEC 60282 High-voltage fuses
- IEC 60286 Packaging of components for automatic handling
- IEC 60287 Electric cables – Calculation of the current rating
- IEC 60294 Measurement of the dimensions of a cylindrical component with axial terminations
- IEC 60296 Fluids for electrotechnical applications – Unused mineral insulating oils for transformers and switchgear
- IEC 60297 Mechanical structures for electronic equipment – Dimensions of mechanical structures of the 482,6 mm (19 in) series
- IEC 60298 high voltage switchgear in metallic enclosure (withdrawn)
- IEC 60299 Household electric blankets – Methods for measuring performance
- IEC 60300 Dependability management
- IEC 60301 Preferred diameters of wire terminations of capacitors and resistors
- IEC 60304 Standard colours for insulation for low-frequency cables and wires
- IEC 60305 Insulators for overhead lines with a nominal voltage above 1000 V – Ceramic or glass insulator units for a.c. systems – Characteristics of insulator units of the cap and pin type
- IEC 60306 Measurement of photosensitive devices
- IEC 60308 Hydraulic turbines – Testing of control systems
- IEC 60309 Plugs, socket-outlets and couplers for industrial purposes
- IEC 60310 Railway applications – Traction transformers and inductors on board rolling stock
- IEC 60311 Electric irons for household or similar use – Methods for measuring performance
- IEC 60315 Methods of measurement on radio receivers for various classes of emission
- IEC 60317 Specifications for particular types of winding wires
- IEC 60318 Electroacoustics – Simulators of human head and ear
- IEC 60319 Presentation and specification of reliability data for electronic components
- IEC 60320 Appliance couplers for household and similar general purposes
- IEC 60322 Railway applications – Electric equipment for rolling stock – Rules for power resistors of open construction
- IEC 60325 Radiation protection instrumentation – Alpha, beta and alpha/beta (beta energy >60 keV) contamination meters and monitors
- IEC 60329 Strip-wound cut cores of grain oriented silicon-iron alloy, used for electronic and telecommunication equipment
- IEC 60331 Tests for electric cables under fire conditions – Circuit integrity
- IEC 60332 Tests on electric and optical fibre cables under fire conditions
- IEC 60335 Household and similar electrical appliances – Safety
- IEC 60336 Medical electrical equipment – X-ray tube assemblies for medical diagnosis – Characteristics of focal spots
- IEC 60338 Telemetering for consumption and demand
- IEC 60339 General purpose rigid coaxial transmission lines and their associated flange connectors
- IEC 60343 Recommended test methods for determining the relative resistance of insulating materials to breakdown by surface discharges
- IEC TR 60344 Calculation of d.c. resistance of plain and coated copper conductors of low-frequency cables and wires – Application guide
- IEC 60345 Method of test for electrical resistance and resistivity of insulating materials at elevated temperatures
- IEC 60347 Transverse track recorders
- IEC 60349 Electric traction – Rotating electrical machines for rail and road vehicles
- IEC 60350 Household electric cooking appliances
- IEC 60352 Solderless connections
- IEC 60353 Line traps for a.c. power systems
- IEC 60356 Dimensions for commutators and slip-rings
- IEC 60357 Tungsten halogen lamps (non vehicle) – Performance specifications
- IEC 60358 Coupling capacitors and capacitor dividers
- IEC 60360 Standard method of measurement of lamp cap temperature rise
- IEC 60364 Low-voltage electrical installations
- IEC 60368 Piezoelectric filters of assessed quality
- IEC 60370 Test procedure for thermal endurance of insulating varnishes – Electric strength method
- IEC 60371 Specification for insulating materials based on mica
- IEC 60372 Locking devices for ball and socket couplings of string insulator units – Dimensions and tests
- IEC 60374 Guide for choosing modular dimensions for waveguide components
- IEC 60375 Conventions concerning electric and magnetic circuits
- IEC 60376 Specification of technical grade sulfur hexafluoride (SF6) for use in electrical equipment
- IEC 60377 Methods for the determination of the dielectric properties of insulating materials at frequencies above 300 MHz
- IEC 60379 Methods for measuring the performance of electric storage water-heaters for household purposes
- IEC 60381 Analogue signals for process control systems
- IEC 60382 Analogue pneumatic signal for process control systems
- IEC 60383 Insulators for overhead lines with a nominal voltage above 1000 V
- IEC 60384 Fixed capacitors for use in electronic equipment
- IEC 60386 Method of measurement of speed fluctuations in sound recording and reproducing equipment
- IEC 60392 Guide for the drafting of specifications for microwave ferrites
- IEC 60393 Potentiometers for use in electronic equipment
- IEC 60394 Varnished fabrics for electrical purposes
- IEC 60397 Test methods for batch furnaces with metallic heating resistors
- IEC 60398 Installations for electroheating and electromagnetic processing – General performance test methods
- IEC 60399 Barrel thread for lampholders with shade holder ring
- IEC 60400 Lampholders for tubular fluorescent lamps and starter holders
- IEC 60401 Terms and nomenclature for cores made of magnetically soft ferrites
- IEC 60404 Magnetic materials
- IEC 60412 Nuclear instrumentation – Nomenclature (identification) of scintillators and scintillation detectors and standard dimensions of scintillators
- IEC 60413 Test procedures for determining physical properties of brush materials for electrical machines
- IEC 60417 Graphical symbols for use on equipment
- IEC 60422 Mineral insulating oils in electrical equipment – Supervision and maintenance guidance
- IEC 60423 Conduit systems for cable management – Outside diameters of conduits for electrical installations and threads for conduits and fittings
- IEC 60424 Ferrite cores – Guidelines on the limits of surface irregularities
- IEC 60426 Electrical insulating materials – Determination of electrolytic corrosion caused by insulating materials – Test methods
- IEC 60428 Standard Cells
- IEC 60432 Incandescent lamps – Safety specifications
- IEC 60433 Insulators for overhead lines with a nominal voltage above 1 000 V – Ceramic insulators for a.c. systems – Characteristics of insulator units of the long rod type
- IEC 60434 Aircraft electrical filament lamps
- IEC 60436 Electric dishwashers for household use – Methods for measuring the performance
- IEC 60437 Radio interference test on high-voltage insulators
- IEC 60439 Low voltage switchgear and control gear assemblies (withdrawn)
- IEC 60440 Method of measurement of non-linearity in resistors
- IEC 60441 Photometric and colorimetric methods of measurement of the light emitted by a cathode-ray tube screen
- IEC 60442 Electric toasters for household and similar purposes – Methods for measuring the performance
- IEC 60444 Measurement of quartz crystal unit parameters by zero phase technique in a pi-network
- IEC 60445 Basic and safety principles for man-machine interface, marking and identification – Identification of equipment terminals, conductor terminations and conductors
- IEC 60446 Wiring colours (Withdrawn, replaced by IEC 60445:2010)
- IEC 60447 Basic and safety principles for man-machine interface, marking and identification – Actuating principles
- IEC 60450 Measurement of the average viscometric degree of polymerization of new and aged cellulosic electrically insulating materials
- IEC 60454 Specifications for pressure-sensitive adhesive tapes for electrical purposes
- IEC 60455 Resin based reactive compounds used for electrical insulation
- IEC 60456 Clothes washing machines for household use – Methods for measuring the performance
- IEC 60457 Rigid precision coaxial and their associated precision connectors
- IEC 60461 Time and control code
- IEC 60462 Nuclear instrumentation – Photomultiplier tubes for scintillation counting – Test procedures
- IEC 60464 Varnishes used for electrical insulation
- IEC 60465 Specification for unused insulating mineral oils for cables with oil ducts
- IEC 60468 Method of measurement of resistivity of metallic materials
- IEC 60469 Transitions, pulses and related waveforms – Terms, definitions and algorithms
- IEC 60471 Dimensions of clevis and tongue couplings of string insulator units
- IEC 60475 Method of sampling insulating liquids
- IEC 60477 Laboratory d.c. resistors
- IEC 60479 Effects of current on human beings and livestock
- IEC 60480 Guidelines for the checking and treatment of sulfur hexafluoride (SF6) taken from electrical equipment and specification for its re-use
- IEC 60481 Coupling devices for power line carrier systems
- IEC 60483 Guide to dynamic measurements of piezoelectric ceramics with high electromechanical coupling
- IEC 60487 Methods of measurement for equipment used in terrestrial radio-relay systems
- IEC 60488 Higher performance protocol for the standard digital interface for programmable instrumentation
- IEC 60489 Methods of measurement for radio equipment used in the mobile services
- IEC 60493 Guide for the statistical analysis of ageing test data
- IEC 60494 Railway applications – Rolling stock – Pantographs – Characteristics and tests
- IEC 60495 Single sideband power-line carrier terminals
- IEC 60496 Methods for measuring the performance of electric warming plates for household and similar purposes
- IEC 60498 High-voltage coaxial connectors used in nuclear instrumentation
- IEC 60499 Voltage limits for electronics to be considered "consumer grade"
- IEC 60500 Underwater acoustics – Hydrophones – Properties of hydrophones in the frequency range 1 Hz to 500 kHz
- IEC 60502 Power cables with extruded insulation and their accessories for rated voltages from 1 kV (U_{m} = 1,2 kV) up to 30 kV (U_{m} = 36 kV)
- IEC 60503 Spools for broadcast videotape recorders (VTRS)
- IEC 60505 Evaluation and qualification of electrical insulation systems
- IEC 60507 Artificial pollution tests on high-voltage ceramic and glass insulators to be used on a.c. systems
- IEC 60510 Methods of measurement for radio equipment used in satellite earth stations
- IEC 60512 Connectors for electronic equipment – Tests and measurements
- IEC TR 60513 Fundamental aspects of safety standards for medical electrical equipment
- IEC 60515 Nuclear power plants – Instrumentation important to safety – Radiation detectors – Characteristics and test methods
- IEC 60519 Safety in installations for electroheating and electromagnetic processing
- IEC 60522 Determination of the permanent filtration of X-ray tube assemblies
- IEC 60523 Direct-current potentiometers
- IEC 60524 Direct-current resistive volt ratio boxes
- IEC 60526 High-voltage cable plug and socket connections for medical X-ray equipment
- IEC 60528 Expression of performance of air quality infra-red analyzers
- IEC 60529 Degrees of protection provided by enclosures (IP Code)
- IEC 60530 Methods for measuring the performance of electric kettles and jugs for household and similar use
- IEC 60531 Household electric thermal storage room heaters – Methods for measuring performance
- IEC 60532 Radiation protection instrumentation – Installed dose rate meters, warning assemblies and monitors – X and gamma radiation of energy between 50 keV and 7 MeV
- IEC 60533 Electrical and electronic installations in ships – Electromagnetic compatibility (EMC) – Ships with a metallic hull
- IEC 60534 Industrial-process control valves
- IEC 60539 Directly heated negative temperature coefficient thermistors
- IEC 60544 Electrical insulating materials – Determination of the effects of ionizing radiation
- IEC 60545 Guide for commissioning, operation and maintenance of hydraulic turbines
- IEC 60546 Controllers with analogue signals for use in industrial-process control systems
- IEC 60549 High-voltage fuses for the external protection of shunt capacitors
- IEC 60554 Specification for cellulosic papers for electrical purposes
- IEC 60556 Gyromagnetic materials intended for application at microwave frequencies – Measuring methods for properties
- IEC 60558 Type C helical video tape recorders
- IEC 60559 Binary floating-point arithmetic for microprocessor systems (withdrawn)
- IEC 60560 Definitions and terminology of brush-holders for electrical machines
- IEC 60562 Measurements of incidental ionizing radiation from electronic tubes
- IEC 60564 D.C. bridges for measuring resistance
- IEC 60565 Underwater acoustics – Hydrophones – Calibration in the frequency range 0,01 Hz to 1 MHz
- IEC 60567 Oil-filled electrical equipment – Sampling of gases and analysis of free and dissolved gases – Guidance
- IEC 60568 Nuclear power plants – Instrumentation important to safety – In-core instrumentation for neutron fluence rate (flux) measurements in power reactors
- IEC 60570 Electrical supply track systems for luminaires
- IEC 60571 Railway applications – Electronic equipment used on rolling stock
- IEC 60574 Audio-visual, video and television equipment and systems (withdrawn)
- IEC TR 60575 Thermal-mechanical performance test and mechanical performance test on string insulator units
- IEC 60580 Medical electrical equipment – Dose area product meters
- IEC 60581 High fidelity audio equipment and systems: Minimum performance requirements
- IEC 60584 Thermocouples
- IEC 60587 Electrical insulating materials used under severe ambient conditions – Test methods for evaluating resistance to tracking and erosion
- IEC 60588 Askarels for transformers and capacitors
- IEC 60589 Methods of test for the determination of ionic impurities in electrical insulating materials by extraction with liquids
- IEC 60590 Determination of the aromatic hydrocarbon content of new mineral insulating oils
- IEC 60598 Luminaires
- IEC 60599 Mineral oil-filled electrical equipment in service – Guidance on the interpretation of dissolved and free gases analysis
- IEC 60600 Equipment for minehead assay and sorting radioactive ores in containers
- IEC 60601 Medical electrical equipment
- IEC 60602 Type B helical video recorders
- IEC 60603 Connectors for frequencies below 3 MHz for use with printed boards
- IEC 60605 Equipment reliability testing
- IEC 60609 Hydraulic turbines, storage pumps and pump-turbines – Cavitation pitting evaluation
- IEC 60613 Electrical and loading characteristics of X-ray tube assemblies for medical diagnosis
- IEC 60615 Terminology for microwave apparatus
- IEC TR 60616 Terminal and tapping markings for power transformers
- IEC 60617 Graphical symbols for diagrams
- IEC 60618 Inductive voltage dividers
- IEC 60619 Electrically operated food preparation appliances – Methods for measuring the performance
- IEC 60622 Secondary cells and batteries containing alkaline or other non-acid electrolytes – nickel-cadmium prismatic rechargeable single cells
- IEC 60623 Secondary cells and batteries containing alkaline or other non-acid electrolytes – Vented nickel-cadmium prismatic rechargeable single cells
- IEC 60624 Expression of the performance of pulse generators
- IEC 60626 Combined flexible materials for electrical insulation
- IEC 60627 Diagnostic X-ray imaging equipment – Characteristics of general purpose and mammographic anti-scatter grids
- IEC 60628 Gassing of insulating liquids under electrical stress and ionization
- IEC 60630 Maximum lamp outlines for incandescent lamps
- IEC 60633 Terminology for high-voltage direct current (HVDC) transmission
- IEC 60635 Toroidal strip-wound cores made of magnetically soft material
- IEC 60636 Flexible waveguide assembly performance
- IEC TR 60638 Criteria for assessing and coding of the commutation of rotating electrical machines for traction
- IEC 60641 Pressboard and presspaper for electrical purposes
- IEC 60642 Piezoelectric ceramic resonator units
- IEC 60644 Specification for high-voltage fuse-links for motor circuit applications
- IEC 60645 Electroacoustics – Audiometric equipment
- IEC 60648 Method of test for coefficients of friction of plastic film and sheeting for use as electrical insulation
- IEC 60651 Sound level meters (Withdrawn, replaced by IEC 61672-1:2002 and IEC 61672-2:2003)
- IEC 60652 Loading tests on overhead line structures
- IEC 60654 Industrial-process measurement and control equipment – Operating conditions
- IEC 60657 Non-ionizing radiation hazards in the frequency range from 10 MHz to 300 000 MHz
- IEC 60660 Insulators – Tests on indoor post insulators of organic material for systems with nominal voltages greater than 1 000 V up to but not including 300 kV
- IEC 60661 Methods for measuring the performance of electric household coffee makers
- IEC 60662 High-pressure sodium vapour lamps – Performance specifications
- IEC 60663 Planning of (single-sideband) power line carrier systems
- IEC 60664 Insulation coordination for equipment within low-voltage systems
- IEC 60665 A.C. electric ventilating fans and regulators for household and similar purposes
- IEC 60666 Detection and determination of specified additives in mineral insulating oils
- IEC 60667 Specification for vulcanized fibre for electrical purposes
- IEC TR 60668 Dimensions of panel areas and cut-outs for panel and rack-mounted industrial-process measurement and control instruments
- IEC 60669 Switches for household and similar fixed-electrical installations
- IEC 60670 Boxes and enclosures for electrical accessories for household and similar fixed electrical installations
- IEC 60671 Nuclear power plants – Instrumentation and control systems important to safety – Surveillance testing
- IEC 60672 Ceramic and glass insulating materials
- IEC 60674 Specification for plastic films for electrical purposes
- IEC 60675 Household electric direct-acting room heaters – Methods for measuring performance
- IEC 60676 Industrial electroheating equipment – Test methods for direct arc furnaces
- IEC 60677 Block transfers in CAMAC systems
- IEC 60679 Piezoelectric, dielectric and electrostatic oscillators of assessed quality
- IEC TS 60680 Test methods of plasma equipment for electroheat and electrochemical applications
- IEC 60682 Standard method of measuring the pinch temperature of quartz-tungsten-halogen lamps
- IEC 60683 Industrial electroheating equipment – Test methods for submerged-arc furnaces
- IEC 60684 Flexible insulating sleeving
- IEC 60688 Electrical measuring transducers for converting A.C. and D.C. electrical quantities to analogue or digital signals
- IEC 60689 Measurement and test methods for tuning fork quartz crystal units in the range from 10 kHz to 200 kHz and standard values
- IEC 60691 Thermal-links – Requirements and application guide
- IEC 60692 Nuclear instrumentation – Density gauges utilizing ionizing radiation – Definitions and test methods
- IEC 60694 Common Specifications For High-Voltage Switchgear and Control gear Standards (Withdrawn, replaced by IEC 62271-1:2007)
- IEC 60695 Fire hazard testing
- IEC 60700 Thyristor valves for high voltage direct current (HVDC) power transmission
- IEC 60702 Mineral insulated cables and their terminations with a rated voltage not exceeding 750 V
- IEC 60703 Test methods for electroheating installations with electron guns
- IEC 60704 Household and similar electrical appliances – Test code for the determination of airborne acoustical noise
- IEC 60705 Household microwave ovens – Methods for measuring performance
- IEC 60706 Maintainability of equipment
- IEC 60708 Low-frequency cables with polyolefin insulation and moisture barrier polyolefin sheath
- IEC 60709 Nuclear power plants – Instrumentation and control systems important to safety – Separation
- IEC 60712 Helical-scan video-tape cassette system using 19 mm (3/4 in) magnetic tape, known as U-format
- IEC 60713 Subroutines for CAMAC
- IEC 60715 Dimensions of low-voltage switchgear and control gear – Standardized mounting on rails for mechanical support of switchgear, control gear and accessories
- IEC 60717 Method for the determination of the space required by capacitors and resistors with unidirectional terminations
- IEC 60719 Calculation of the lower and upper limits for the average outer dimensions of cables with circular copper conductors and of rated voltages up to and including 450/750 V
- IEC 60720 Characteristics of line post insulators
- IEC 60721 Classification of environmental conditions
- IEC 60724 Short-circuit temperature limits of electric cables with rated voltages of 1 kV (U_{m} = 1,2 kV) and 3 kV (U_{m} = 3,6 kV)
- IEC TR 60725 Consideration of reference impedances and public supply network impedances for use in determining the disturbance characteristics of electrical equipment having a rated current ≤75 A per phase
- IEC 60726 Dry type power transformers
- IEC 60728 Cable networks for television signals, sound signals and interactive services
- IEC 60729 Multiple controllers in a CAMAC crate
- IEC 60730 Automatic electrical controls
- IEC 60731 Medical electrical equipment – Dosimeters with ionization chambers as used in radiotherapy
- IEC 60732 Measuring methods for cylinder cores, tube cores and screw cores of magnetic oxides
- IEC 60734 Household electrical appliances – Performance – Water for testing
- IEC 60735 Measuring methods for video tape properties
- IEC TR 60736 Testing equipment for electrical energy meters
- IEC 60737 Nuclear power plants – Instrumentation important to safety – Temperature sensors (in-core and primary coolant circuit) – Characteristics and test methods
- IEC 60738 Thermistors – Directly heated positive temperature coefficient
- IEC 60740 Laminations for transformers and inductors
- IEC 60743 Live working – Terminology for tools, devices and equipment
- IEC 60744 Safety logic assemblies of nuclear power plants – Characteristics and test methods
- IEC 60745 Hand-held motor-operated electric tools – Safety
- IEC 60746 Expression of performance of electrochemical analyzers
- IEC 60747 Semiconductor devices
- IEC 60748 Semiconductor devices – Integrated circuits
- IEC 60749 Semiconductor devices – Mechanical and climatic test methods
- IEC 60750 Item designation in electrotechnology (Withdrawn! This publication has been replaced by IEC 61346-1:1996)
- IEC 60751 Industrial platinum resistance thermometers and platinum temperature sensors
- IEC 60754 Test on gases evolved during combustion of materials from cables
- IEC TR 60755 General requirements for residual current operated protective devices
- IEC 60756 Non-broadcast video tape recorders – Time base stability
- IEC 60757 Code for designation of colours
- IEC 60758 Synthetic quartz crystal – Specifications and guidelines for use
- IEC 60759 Standard test procedures for semiconductor X-ray energy spectrometers
- IEC 60760 Flat, quick-connect terminations (merged into IEC 61210:2010-08)
- IEC 60761 Equipment for continuous monitoring of radioactivity in gaseous effluents
- IEC 60763 Laminated pressboard for electrical purposes
- IEC 60767 Helical-scan video-tape cassette system using 12.65 mm (0.5 in) magnetic tape on type beta-format
- IEC 60768 Nuclear power plants – Instrumentation important to safety – Equipment for continuous in-line or on-line monitoring of radioactivity in process streams for normal and incident conditions
- IEC 60770 Transmitters for use in industrial-process control systems
- IEC 60772 Electrical penetration assemblies in containment structures for nuclear power generating stations
- IEC 60773 Test methods and apparatus for measurement of the operational characteristics of brushes
- IEC 60774 Helical-scan video tape cassette system using 12,65 mm (0,5 in) magnetic tape on type VHS
- IEC 60775 Real-time BASIC for CAMAC
- IEC TR 60778 Brush-holders for slip-rings, Group R – type RA
- IEC 60779 Industrial electroheat equipment – Test methods for electroslag remelting furnaces
- IEC TR 60782 Measurements of ultrasonic magnetostrictive transducers
- IEC TR 60788 Medical electrical equipment – Glossary of defined terms
- IEC 60793 Optical fibres
- IEC 60794 Optical fibre cables
- IEC 60796 Microprocessor system bus – 8-bit and 16-bit data (MULTIBUS I)
- IEC TR 60797 Residual strength of string insulator units of glass or ceramic material for overhead lines after mechanical damage of the dielectric
- IEC 60799 Electrical accessories – Cord sets and interconnection cord sets
- IEC 60800 Heating cables with a rated voltage of 300/500 V for comfort heating and prevention of ice formation
- IEC 60801 EMI and RFI Immunity (withdrawn)
- IEC 60803 Recommended dimensions for hexagonal and square crimping-die cavities, indentors, ganges, outer conductor crimp sleeves and centre contact crimp barrels for R.F. cables and connectors
- IEC 60805 Guide for commissioning, operation and maintenance of storage pumps and of pump-turbines operating as pumps
- IEC 60806 Determination of the maximum symmetrical radiation field from a rotating anode X-ray tube for medical diagnosis
- IEC 60807 Rectangular connectors for frequencies below 3 MHz
- IEC 60809 Lamps for road vehicles – Dimensional, electrical and luminous requirements
- IEC 60810 Lamps for road vehicles – Performance requirements
- IEC 60811 Electric and optical fibre cables – Test methods for non-metallic materials
- IEC 60812 Analysis techniques for system reliability – Procedure for failure mode and effects analysis (FMEA)
- IEC 60814 Insulating liquids – Oil-impregnated paper and pressboard – Determination of water by automatic coulometric Karl Fischer titration
- IEC TS 60815 Selection and dimensioning of high-voltage insulators intended for use in polluted conditions
- IEC TS 60816 Guide on methods of measurement of short duration transients on low-voltage power and signal lines
- IEC 60819 Non-cellulosic papers for electrical purposes
- IEC 60821 VMEbus – Microprocessor system bus for 1 byte to 4 byte data
- IEC 60822 VSB – Parallel Sub-system Bus of the IEC 60821 VMEbus
- IEC 60824 Terminology related to microprocessors
- IEC 60825 Safety of laser products
- IEC 60826 Design criteria of overhead transmission lines
- IEC 60828 Pin allocations for microprocessor systems using the IEC 60603-2connector
- IEC 60831 Shunt power capacitors of the self-healing type for a.c. systems having a rated voltage up to and including 1 000 V
- IEC 60832 Live working – Insulating sticks and attachable devices
- IEC 60834 Tele-protection equipment of power systems – Performance and testing
- IEC 60835 Methods of measurement for equipment used in digital microwave radio transmission systems
- IEC 60836 Specifications for unused silicone insulating liquids for electrotechnical purposes
- IEC 60838 Miscellaneous lampholders
- IEC 60839 Alarm and electronic security systems
- IEC 60840 Power cables with extruded insulation and their accessories for rated voltages above 30 kV (U_{m} = 36 kV) up to 150 kV (U_{m} = 170 kV) – Test methods and requirements
- IEC 60841 Audio recording – PCM encoder/decoder system
- IEC 60843 Helical-scan video tape cassette system using 8 mm magnetic tape – 8 mm video
- IEC 60846 Radiation protection instrumentation – Ambient and/or directional dose equivalent (rate) meters and/or monitors for beta, X and gamma radiation
- IEC 60848 GRAFCET specification language for sequential function charts
- IEC 60849 Sound Systems for Emergency Purposes (withdrawn)
- IEC 60850 Railway applications – Supply voltages of traction systems
- IEC 60851 Methods of test for winding wires
- IEC 60852 Outline dimensions of transformers and inductors for use in telecommunication and electronic equipment
- IEC 60853 Calculation of the cyclic and emergency current rating of cables
- IEC TR 60854 Methods of measuring the performance of ultrasonic pulse-echo diagnostic equipment
- IEC 60855 Live working – Insulating foam-filled tubes and solid rods
- IEC 60856 Prerecorded optical reflective video disk system 'Laser vision' 50 Hz/625 lines – PAL
- IEC 60857 Prerecorded optical reflective video disk system 'Laser vision' 60 Hz/525 lines – M/NTSC
- IEC 60860 Radiation protection instrumentation – Warning equipment for criticality accidents
- IEC 60861 Equipment for monitoring of radionuclides in liquid effluents and surface waters
- IEC 60862 Surface acoustic wave (SAW) filters of assessed quality
- IEC 60864 Standardization of interconnections between broadcasting transmitters or transmitter systems and supervisory equipment
- IEC 60865 Short-circuit currents – Calculation of effects
- IEC 60867 Insulating liquids – Specifications for unused liquids based on synthetic aromatic hydrocarbons
- IEC 60869 Fibre optic interconnecting devices and passive components – Fibre optic passive power control devices
- IEC 60870 Telecontrol equipment and systems
- IEC 60871 Shunt capacitors for a.c. power systems having a rated voltage above 1 000 V
- IEC 60873 Electrical and pneumatic analogue chart recorders for use in industrial-process systems
- IEC 60874 Fibre optic interconnecting devices and passive components – Connectors for optical fibres and cables
- IEC 60875 Fibre optic interconnecting devices and passive components – Non-wavelength-selective fibre optic branching devices
- IEC 60876 Fibre optic interconnecting devices and passive components – Fibre optic spatial switches
- IEC TR 60877 Procedures for ensuring the cleanliness of industrial-process measurement and control equipment in oxygen service
- IEC TR 60878 Graphical symbols for electrical equipment in medical practice
- IEC 60879 Performance and construction of electric circulating fans and regulators
- IEC 60880 Nuclear power plants – Instrumentation and control systems important to safety – Software aspects for computer-based systems performing category A functions
- IEC 60882 Pre-heat requirements for starterless tubular fluorescent lamps
- IEC 60883 Measuring method for chrominance signal-to-random noise ratio for video tape recorders
- IEC 60884 Plugs and socket-outlets for household and similar purposes
- IEC 60885 Electrical test methods for electric cables
- IEC TR 60886 Investigations on test procedures for ultrasonic cleaners
- IEC TR 60887 Glass bulb designation system for lamps
- IEC 60888 Zinc-coated steel wires for stranded conductors
- IEC 60889 Hard-drawn aluminium wire for overhead line conductors
- IEC TR 60890 A method of temperature-rise verification of low-voltage switchgear and controlgear assemblies by calculation
- IEC 60891 Photovoltaic devices – Procedures for temperature and irradiance corrections to measured I-V characteristics
- IEC 60893 Insulating materials – Industrial rigid laminated sheets based on thermosetting resins for electrical purposes
- IEC 60895 Live working – Conductive clothing for use at nominal voltage up to 800 kV a.c. and ± 600 kV d.c.
- IEC 60896 Stationary lead-acid batteries
- IEC 60897 Methods for the determination of the lightning breakdown voltage of insulating liquids
- IEC 60898 Electrical accessories – Circuit-breakers for overcurrent protection for household and similar installations
- IEC TS 60899 Sampling rate and source encoding for professional digital audio recording
- IEC 60900 Live working – Hand tools for use up to 1 000 V a.c. and 1 500 V d.c.
- IEC 60901 Single-capped fluorescent lamps – Performance specifications
- IEC 60903 Live working – Electrical insulating gloves
- IEC 60904 Photovoltaic devices
- IEC 60906 IEC system of plugs and socket-outlets for household and similar purposes
- IEC 60908 Audio recording – Compact disc digital audio system
- IEC 60909 Short-circuit currents in three-phase a.c. systems
- IEC 60910 Containment monitoring instrumentation for early detection of developing deviations from normal operation in light water reactors
- IEC 60911 Measurements for monitoring adequate cooling within the core of pressurized light water reactors
- IEC 60912 Nuclear instrumentation – ECL (emitter coupled logic) front panel interconnections in counter logic
- IEC 60913 Railway applications – Fixed installations – Electric traction overhead contact lines
- IEC 60915 Capacitors and resistors for use in electronic equipment – Preferred dimensions of shaft ends, bushes and for the mounting of single-hole, bush-mounted, shaft-operated electronic components
- IEC 60917 Modular order for the development of mechanical structures for electronic equipment practices
- IEC 60918 PVC insulated ribbon cable with a pitch of 1.27 mm suitable for insulation displacement termination
- IEC TR 60919 Performance of high-voltage direct current (HVDC) systems with line-commutated converters
- IEC 60921 Ballasts for tubular fluorescent lamps – Performance requirements
- IEC 60923 Auxiliaries for lamps – Ballasts for discharge lamps (excluding tubular fluorescent lamps) – Performance requirements
- IEC 60927 Auxiliaries for lamps – Starting devices (other than glow starters)- Performance requirements
- IEC 60929 AC and/or DC-supplied electronic control gear for tubular fluorescent lamps – Performance requirements
- IEC TR 60930 Guidelines for administrative, medical and nursing staff concerned with the safe use of medical electrical equipment and medical electrical systems
- IEC 60931 Shunt power capacitors of the non-self-healing type for a.c. systems having a rated voltage up to and including 1000 V
- IEC 60933 Audio, video and audiovisual systems – Interconnections and matching values
- IEC 60934 Circuit-breakers for equipment (CBE)
- IEC 60935 Nuclear instrumentation – Modular high speed data acquisition system – FASTBUS
- IEC 60938 Fixed inductors for electromagnetic interference suppression
- IEC 60939 Passive filter units for electromagnetic interference suppression
- IEC 60940 Guidance information on the application of capacitors, resistors, inductors and complete filter units for electromagnetic interference suppression
- IEC 60942 Electroacoustics – Sound calibrators
- IEC TR 60943 Guidance concerning the permissible temperature rise for parts of electrical equipment, in particular for terminals
- IEC 60944 Guide for the maintenance of silicone transformer liquids
- IEC 60945 Maritime navigation and radiocommunication equipment and systems – General requirements – Methods of testing and required test results
- IEC 60946 Binary direct voltage signals for process measurement and control systems
- IEC 60947 Low-voltage switchgear and control gear
- IEC 60948 Numeric keyboard for home electronic systems (HES)
- IEC 60949 Calculation of thermally permissible short-circuit currents, taking into account non-adiabatic heating effects
- IEC 60950 Information technology equipment – Safety
- IEC 60951 Nuclear power plants – Instrumentation important to safety – Radiation monitoring for accident and post-accident conditions
- IEC 60952 Aircraft batteries
- IEC 60953 Rules for steam turbine thermal acceptance tests
- IEC 60958 Digital audio interface
- IEC 60960 Functional design criteria for a safety parameter display system for nuclear power stations
- IEC 60961 Helical-scan video tape cassette system using 12,65 mm (0,5 in) magnetic tape on type L
- IEC 60963 Specification for unused polybutenes
- IEC 60964 Nuclear power plants – Control rooms – Design
- IEC 60965 Nuclear power plants – Control rooms – Supplementary control room for reactor shutdown without access to the main control room
- IEC 60966 Radio frequency and coaxial cable assemblies
- IEC 60968 Self-ballasted fluorescent lamps for general lighting services – Safety requirements
- IEC 60969 Self-ballasted compact fluorescent lamps for general lighting services – Performance requirements
- IEC 60970 Insulating liquids – Methods for counting and sizing particles
- IEC 60973 Test procedures for germanium gamma-ray detectors
- IEC 60974 Arc welding equipment
- IEC 60976 Medical electrical equipment – Medical electron accelerators – Functional performance characteristics
- IEC TR 60977 Medical electrical equipment – Medical electron accelerators – Guidelines for functional performance characteristics
- IEC 60979 Wires for wire wrapping applications
- IEC 60980-344 IEC/IEEE 60980-344 Nuclear facilities – Equipment important to safety – Seismic qualification
- IEC 60981 Extra heavy-duty electrical rigid steel conduits
- IEC 60982 Level measuring systems utilizing ionizing radiation with continuous or switching output
- IEC 60983 Miniature lamps
- IEC 60984 Live working – Electrical insulating sleeves
- IEC 60986 Short-circuit temperature limits of electric cables with rated voltages from 6 kV (U_{m} = 7,2 kV) up to 30 kV (U_{m} = 36 kV)
- IEC 60987 Nuclear power plants – Instrumentation and control important to safety – Hardware design requirements for computer-based systems
- IEC 60988 Nuclear power plants – Instrumentation important to safety – Acoustic monitoring systems for detection of loose parts: characteristics, design criteria and operational procedures
- IEC 60989 Separating transformers, autotransformers, variable transformers and reactors
- IEC 60990 Methods of measurement of touch current and protective conductor current
- IEC 60993 Electrolyte for vented nickel-cadmium cells
- IEC 60994 Guide for field measurement of vibrations and pulsations in hydraulic machines (turbines, storage pumps and pump-turbines)
- IEC TR 60996 Method for verifying accuracy of tan delta measurements applicable to capacitors
- IEC 60998 Connecting devices for low-voltage circuits for household and similar purposes
- IEC 60999 Connecting devices – Electrical copper conductors – Safety requirements for screw-type and screwless-type clamping units
- IEC 61000 Electromagnetic compatibility (EMC)
- IEC 61003 Industrial-process control systems – Instruments with analogue inputs and two- or multi-position outputs
- IEC 61005 Radiation protection instrumentation – Neutron ambient dose equivalent (rate) meters
- IEC 61007 Transformers and inductors for use in electronic and telecommunication equipment – Measuring methods and test procedures
- IEC 61008 Residual current operated circuit-breakers without integral overcurrent protection for household and similar uses (RCCBs)
- IEC 61009 Residual current operated circuit breakers with integral overcurrent protection for household and similar uses (RCBOs)
- IEC 61010 Safety requirements for electrical equipment for measurement, control, and laboratory use
- IEC 61012 Filters for the measurement of audible sound in the presence of ultrasound
- IEC 61014 Programmes for reliability growth
- IEC TR 61015 Brush-holders for electrical machines. Guide to the measurement of the static thrust applied to brushes
- IEC 61016 Helical-scan digital component video cassette recording system using 19 mm magnetic tape (format D-1)
- IEC 61017 Radiation protection instrumentation – Transportable, mobile or installed equipment to measure photon radiation for environmental monitoring
- IEC 61018 Surface acoustic wave (SAW) resonators
- IEC 61020 Electromechanical switches for use in electrical and electronic equipment
- IEC 61021 Laminated core packages for transformers and inductors used in telecommunication and electronic equipment
- IEC 61023 Maritime navigation and radiocommunication equipment and systems – Marine speed and distance measuring equipment (SDME) – Performance requirements, methods of testing and required test results
- IEC 61024 Protection of structures against lightning (Withdrawn, replaced by parts of IEC 62305)
- IEC 61025 Fault tree analysis (FTA)
- IEC 61028 Electrical measuring instruments – X-Y recorders
- IEC 61029 Safety of transportable motor-operated electric tools
- IEC 61030 Domestic Digital Bus – a standard for a low-speed multi-master serial communication bus for home automation applications. (withdrawn)
- IEC 61031 Design, location and application criteria for installed area gamma radiation dose rate monitoring equipment for use in nuclear power plants during normal operation and anticipated operational occurrences
- IEC 61032 Protection of persons and equipment by enclosures – Probes for verification
- IEC 61033 Test methods for the determination of bond strength of impregnating agents to an enamelled wire substrate
- IEC 61034 Measurement of smoke density of cables burning under defined conditions
- IEC 61039 Classification of insulating liquids
- IEC 61041 Non-broadcast video tape recorders. Methods of measurement
- IEC 61043 Electroacoustics – Instruments for the measurement of sound intensity – Measurements with pairs of pressure sensing microphones
- IEC TR 61044 Opportunity-charging of lead-acid traction batteries
- IEC 61047 DC or AC supplied electronic step-down converters for filament lamps – Performance requirements
- IEC 61048 Auxiliaries for lamps – Capacitors for use in tubular fluorescent and other discharge lamp circuits – General and safety requirements
- IEC 61049 Capacitors for use in tubular fluorescent and other discharge lamp circuits. Performance requirements
- IEC 61050 Transformers for tubular discharge lamps having a no-load output voltage exceeding 1000 V (generally called neon-transformers). General and safety requirements
- IEC 61051 Varistors for use in electronic equipment
- IEC 61052 IEC 1052 FASTBUS standard routines. Standard routines for use with FASTBUS data acquisition system
- IEC 61053 Helical-scan video tape cassette system using 12,65 mm (0,5 in) magnetic tape on type Beta format – FM audio recording
- IEC TR 61055 Measurement techniques and operational adjustments of broadcast VTRs
- IEC 61056 General purpose lead-acid batteries (valve-regulated types)
- IEC 61058 Switches for appliances
- IEC 61061 Non-impregnated densified laminated wood for electrical purposes
- IEC 61063 Acoustics – Measurement of airborne noise emitted by steam turbines and driven machinery
- IEC 61064 Acceptance tests for steam turbine speed control systems
- IEC 61065 Method for evaluating the low temperature flow properties of mineral insulating oils after ageing
- IEC 61067 Specification for glass and glass polyester fibre woven tapes
- IEC 61068 Specification for polyester fibre woven tapes
- IEC 61069 Industrial-process measurement, control and automation – Evaluation of system properties for the purpose of system assessment
- IEC 61070 Compliance test procedures for steady-state availability
- IEC 61071 Capacitors for power electronics
- IEC 61073 Fibre optic interconnecting devices and passive components – Mechanical splices and fusion splice protectors for optical fibres and cables
- IEC 61076 Connectors for electronic equipment – Product requirements
- IEC 61077 Helical-scan video tape cassette system using 12.65 mm (0.5 in) magnetic tape on type VHS – Compact VHS video cassette
- IEC 61078 Reliability block diagrams
- IEC 61079 Methods of measurement on receivers for satellite broadcast transmissions in the 12 GHz band
- IEC 61080 Guide to the measurement of equivalent electrical parameters of quartz crystal units
- IEC TS 61081 Pneumatic instruments driven by associated process gas – Safe installation and operating procedures – Guidelines
- IEC 61082 Preparation of documents used in electrotechnology
- IEC 61083 Instruments and software used for measurement in high-voltage and high-current tests
- IEC 61084 Cable trunking systems and cable ducting systems for electrical installations
- IEC TS 61085 General considerations for telecommunication services for electric power systems
- IEC 61086 Coatings for loaded printed wire boards (conformal coatings)
- IEC TR 61088 Characteristics and measurements of ultrasonic piezoceramic transducers
- IEC 61089 Round wire concentric lay overhead electrical stranded conductors
- IEC 61094 Measurement microphones
- IEC 61095 Electromechanical contactors for household and similar purposes
- IEC 61096 Methods of measuring the characteristics of reproducing equipment for digital audio compact discs
- IEC 61097 Global maritime distress and safety system (GMDSS)
- IEC 61098 Radiation protection instrumentation – Installed personnel surface contamination monitoring assemblies
- IEC 61099 Insulating liquids – Specifications for unused synthetic organic esters for electrical purposes
- IEC 61104 Compact disc video system – 12 cm CD-V
- IEC 61105 Reference tapes for video tape recorder systems
- IEC 61106 Videodisks – Methods of measurement for parameters
- IEC 61108 Maritime navigation and radiocommunication equipment and systems – Global navigation satellite systems (GNSS)
- IEC 61109 Insulators for overhead lines – Composite suspension and tension insulators for a.c. systems with a nominal voltage greater than 1 000 V – Definitions, test methods and acceptance criteria
- IEC 61111 Live working – Electrical insulating matting
- IEC 61112 Live working – Electrical insulating blankets
- IEC 61114 Receiving antennas for satellite broadcast transmissions in the 11/12 GHz band
- IEC 61115 Expression of performance of sample handling systems for process analyzers
- IEC 61116 Electromechanical equipment guide for small hydroelectric installations
- IEC 61118 Helical-scan video tape cassette system using 12,65 mm (0,5 in) magnetic tape – Type M2
- IEC 61119 Digital audio tape cassette system (DAT)
- IEC 61120 Digital audio tape recorder reel to reel system, using 6,3 mm magnetic tape, for professional use
- IEC 61121 Tumble dryers for household use – Methods for measuring the performance
- IEC 61123 Reliability testing – Compliance test plans for success ratio
- IEC 61124 Reliability testing – Compliance tests for constant failure rate and constant failure intensity
- IEC 61125 Unused hydrocarbon based insulating liquids – Test methods for evaluating the oxidation stability
- IEC 61126 Procedure for use in the preparation of maximum lamp outlines
- IEC TR 61127 High pressure xenon short arc lamps – Dimensional, electrical and photometric data and cap types
- IEC 61131 Industrial-process measurement and control – Programmable controllers
- IEC 61133 Railway applications – Rolling stock – Testing of rolling stock on completion of construction and before entry into service
- IEC 61138 Cables for portable earthing and short-circuiting equipment
- IEC 61140 Protection against electric shock – Common aspects for installation and equipment
- IEC TR 61141 Upper frequency limit of r.f. coaxial connectors
- IEC 61143 Electrical measuring instruments – X-t recorders
- IEC 61144 Test method for the determination of oxygen index of insulating liquids
- IEC 61145 Calibration and usage of ionization chamber systems for assay of radionuclides
- IEC 61146 Video cameras (PAL/SECAM/NTSC) – Methods of measurement
- IEC 61148 Terminal markings for valve device stacks and assemblies and for power conversion equipment
- IEC TS 61149 Guide for safe handling and operation of mobile radio equipment
- IEC 61152 Dimensions of metal-sheathed thermometer elements
- IEC 61156 Multicore and symmetrical pair/quad cables for digital communications
- IEC 61157 Standard means for the reporting of the acoustic output of medical diagnostic ultrasonic equipment
- IEC 61158 Industrial communication networks – Fieldbus specifications
- IEC 61160 Design review
- IEC 61161 Ultrasonics – Power measurement – Radiation force balances and performance requirements
- IEC 61162 Maritime navigation and radiocommunication equipment and systems – Digital interfaces
- IEC 61163 Reliability stress screening
- IEC 61164 Reliability growth – Statistical test and estimation methods
- IEC 61165 Application of Markov techniques
- IEC 61167 Metal halide lamps – Performance specification
- IEC 61168 Radiotherapy simulators – Functional performance characteristics
- IEC 61169 Radio frequency connectors
- IEC TS 61170 Radiotherapy simulators – Guidelines for functional performance characteristics
- IEC 61171 Radiation protection instrumentation – Monitoring equipment – Atmospheric radioactive iodines in the environment
- IEC 61172 Radiation protection instrumentation – Monitoring equipment – Radioactive aerosols in the environment
- IEC 61174 Maritime navigation and radiocommunication equipment and systems – Electronic chart display and information system (ECDIS) – Operational and performance requirements, methods of testing and required test results
- IEC 61175 Industrial systems, installations and equipment and industrial products – Designation of signals
- IEC 61176 Hand-held electric mains voltage operated circular saws – Methods for measuring the performance
- IEC 61178 Quartz crystal units – A specification in the IEC Quality Assessment System for Electronic Components (IECQ)
- IEC 61179 Helical-scan digital composite video cassette recording system using 19 mm magnetic tape, format D2 (NTSC, PAL, PAL-M)
- IEC 61180 High-voltage test techniques for low-voltage equipment – Definitions, test and procedure requirements, test equipment
- IEC 61181 Mineral oil-filled electrical equipment – Application of dissolved gas analysis (DGA) to factory tests on electrical equipment
- IEC PAS 61182 Generic requirements for printed board assembly products manufacturing description data and transfer methodology
- IEC 61183 Electroacoustics – Random-incidence and diffuse-field calibration of sound level meters
- IEC 61184 Bayonet lampholders
- IEC 61187 Electrical and electronic measuring equipment – Documentation
- IEC 61188 Printed boards and printed board assemblies – Design and use
- IEC 61189 Test methods for electrical materials, interconnection structures and assemblies
- IEC 61190 Attachment materials for electronic assembly
- IEC 61191 Printed board assemblies
- IEC 61192 Workmanship requirements for soldered electronic assemblies
- IEC 61193 Quality assessment systems
- IEC 61194 Characteristic parameters of stand-alone photovoltaic (PV) systems (Withdrawn, replaced by IEC TS 61836:2007)
- IEC 61195 Double-capped fluorescent lamps – Safety specifications
- IEC 61196 Coaxial communication cables
- IEC 61197 Insulating liquids – Linear flame propagation – Test method using a glass-fibre tape
- IEC 61198 Mineral insulating oils – Methods for the determination of 2-furfural and related compounds
- IEC 61199 Single-capped fluorescent lamps – Safety specifications
- IEC 61200 Electrical installation guide
- IEC TS 61201 Use of conventional touch voltage limits – Application guide
- IEC 61203 Synthetic organic esters for electrical purposes – Guide for maintenance of transformer esters in equipment
- IEC 61204 Low-voltage power supply devices, d.c. output – Performance characteristics
- IEC 61205 Ultrasonics – Dental descaler systems – Measurement and declaration of the output characteristics
- IEC TS 61206 Ultrasonics – Continuous-wave Doppler systems – Test procedures
- IEC 61207 Expression of performance of gas analyzers
- IEC 61210 Connecting devices – Flat quick-connect terminations for electrical copper conductors – Safety requirements
- IEC 61211 Insulators of ceramic material or glass for overhead lines with a nominal voltage greater than 1 000 V – Impulse puncture testing in air
- IEC 61212 Insulating materials – Industrial rigid round laminated tubes and rods based on thermosetting resins for electrical purposes
- IEC 61213 Analogue audio recording on video tape – Polarity of magnetization
- IEC 61215 Terrestrial photovoltaic (PV) modules – Design qualification and type approval
- IEC 61217 Radiotherapy equipment – Coordinates, movements and scales
- IEC 61219 Live working – Earthing or earthing and short-circuiting equipment using lances as a short-circuiting device – Lance earthing
- IEC 61223 Evaluation and routine testing in medical imaging departments
- IEC 61224 Nuclear reactors – Response time in resistance temperature detectors (RTD) – In situ measurements
- IEC 61225 Nuclear power plants – Instrumentation and control systems important to safety – Requirements for electrical supplies
- IEC 61226 Nuclear power plants – Instrumentation and control important to safety – Classification of instrumentation and control functions
- IEC 61227 Nuclear power plants – Control rooms – Operator controls
- IEC 61228 Fluorescent ultraviolet lamps used for tanning – Measurement and specification method
- IEC 61229 Rigid protective covers for live working on a.c. installations
- IEC 61230 Live working – Portable equipment for earthing or earthing and short-circuiting
- IEC 61231 International lamp coding system (ILCOS)
- IEC 61232 Aluminium-clad steel wires for electrical purposes
- IEC 61234 Method of test for the hydrolytic stability of electrical insulating materials
- IEC 61235 Live working – Insulating hollow tubes for electrical purposes
- IEC 61236 Live working – Saddles, stick clamps and their accessories
- IEC 61237 Broadcast video tape recorders – Methods of measurement
- IEC 61238 Compression and mechanical connectors for power cables for rated voltages up to 30 kV (Um = 36 kV)
- IEC 61239 Nuclear instrumentation – Portable gamma radiation meters and spectrometers used for prospecting – Definitions, requirements and calibration
- IEC 61240 Piezoelectric devices – Preparation of outline drawings of surface-mounted devices (SMD) for frequency control and selection – General rules
- IEC 61241 Electrical apparatus for use in the presence of combustible dust (withdrawn)
- IEC 61242 Electrical accessories – Cable reels for household and similar purposes
- IEC 61243 Live working – Voltage detectors
- IEC TS 61244 Determination of long-term radiation ageing in polymers
- IEC TS 61245 Artificial pollution tests on high-voltage ceramic and glass insulators to be used on d.c. systems
- IEC 61247 PM-cores made of magnetic oxides and associated parts – Dimensions
- IEC 61248 Transformers and inductors for use in electronic and telecommunication equipment
- IEC 61249 Materials for printed boards and other interconnecting structures
- IEC 61250 Nuclear reactors – Instrumentation and control systems important for safety – Detection of leakage in coolant systems
- IEC 61251 Electrical insulating materials and systems – AC voltage endurance evaluation
- IEC 61252 Electroacoustics – Specifications for personal sound exposure meters
- IEC 61253 Piezoelectric ceramic resonators – A specification in the IEC quality assessment system for electronic components (IECQ)
- IEC 61254 Electric shavers for household use – Methods for measuring the performance
- IEC 61256 Radiation protection instrumentation – Installed monitors for the detection of radioactive contamination of laundry
- IEC TR 61258 Guidelines for the development and use of medical electrical equipment educational materials
- IEC 61260 Electroacoustics – Octave-band and fractional-octave-band filters
- IEC 61261 Piezoelectric ceramic filters for use in electronic equipment – A specification in the IEC quality assessment system for electronic components (IECQ)
- IEC 61262 Medical electrical equipment – Characteristics of electro-optical X-ray image intensifiers
- IEC 61265 Electroacoustics – Instruments for measurement of aircraft noise – Performance requirements for systems to measure one-third-octave-band sound pressure levels in noise certification of transport-category aeroplanes
- IEC 61266 Ultrasonics – Hand-held probe Doppler foetal heartbeat detectors – Performance requirements and methods of measurement and reporting
- IEC 61267 Medical diagnostic X-ray equipment – Radiation conditions for use in the determination of characteristics
- IEC 61270 Capacitors for microwave ovens
- IEC 61274 Fibre optic interconnecting devices and passive components – Adaptors for fibre optic connectors
- IEC 61275 Radiation protection instrumentation – Measurement of discrete radionuclides in the environment – In situ photon spectrometry system using a germanium detector
- IEC 61277 Terrestrial photovoltaic (PV) power generating systems – General and guide (withdrawn)
- IEC 61280 Fibre optic communication subsystem basic test procedures
- IEC 61281 Fibre optic communication subsystems
- IEC TR 61282 Fibre optic communication system design guides
- IEC 61284 Overhead lines – Requirements and tests for fittings
- IEC 61285 Industrial-process control – Safety of analyser houses
- IEC 61286 Character set with electrotechnical symbols (withdrawn)
- IEC 61287 Railway applications – Power converters installed on board rolling stock
- IEC TR 61289 High frequency surgical equipment – Operation and maintenance
- IEC 61290 Optical amplifiers – Test methods
- IEC 61291 Optical amplifiers
- IEC TR 61292 Optical amplifiers
- IEC 61293 Marking of electrical equipment with ratings related to electrical supply – Safety requirements
- IEC TR 61294 Insulating liquids – Determination of the partial discharge inception voltage (PDIV) – Test procedure
- IEC TR 61295 Calibration tapes for broadcast VTRs
- IEC 61297 Industrial-process control systems – Classification of adaptive controllers for the purpose of evaluation
- IEC 61298 Process measurement and control devices – General methods and procedures for evaluating performance
- IEC 61300 Fibre optic interconnecting devices and passive components – Basic test and measurement procedures
- IEC 61301 Nuclear instrumentation – Digital bus for NIM instruments
- IEC 61302 Electrical insulating materials – Method to evaluate the resistance to tracking and erosion – Rotating wheel dip test
- IEC 61303 Medical electrical equipment – Radionuclide calibrators – Particular methods for describing performance
- IEC 61304 Nuclear instrumentation – Liquid-scintillation counting systems – Performance verification
- IEC 61305 Household high-fidelity audio equipment and systems – Methods of measuring and specifying the performance
- IEC 61307 Industrial microwave heating installations – Test methods for the determination of power output
- IEC 61308 High-frequency dielectric heating installations – Test methods for the determination of power output
- IEC 61309 Deep-fat fryers for household use – Methods for measuring the performance
- IEC 61310 Safety of machinery – Indication, marking and actuation
- IEC 61314 Fibre optic interconnecting devices and passive components – Fibre optic fan-outs
- IEC 61315 Calibration of fibre-optic power meters
- IEC 61316 Industrial cable reels
- IEC 61318 Live working – Conformity assessment applicable to tools, devices and equipment
- IEC 61319 Interconnections of satellite receiving equipment
- IEC 61322 Radiation protection instrumentation – Installed dose equivalent rate meters, warning assemblies and monitors for neutron radiation of energy from thermal to 15 MeV
- IEC 61325 Insulators for overhead lines with a nominal voltage above 1000 V – Ceramic or glass insulator units for d.c. systems – Definitions, test methods and acceptance criteria
- IEC 61326 Electrical equipment for measurement, control and laboratory use – EMC requirements
- IEC 61327 Helical-scan digital composite video cassette recording system using 12,65 mm (0,5 in) magnetic tape – Format D-3
- IEC 61328 Live working – Guidelines for the installation of transmission and distribution line conductors and earth wires – Stringing equipment and accessory items
- IEC 61329 Sound system equipment – Methods of measuring and specifying the performance of sounders (electroacoustic transducers for tone production)
- IEC 61331 Protective devices against diagnostic medical X-radiation
- IEC 61332 Soft ferrite material classification
- IEC 61333 Marking on U and E ferrite cores
- IEC 61334 Distribution automation using distribution line carrier systems – a standard for low-speed reliable power line communications by electricity meters, water meters and SCADA
- IEC 61335 Nuclear instrumentation – Bore-hole apparatus for X-ray fluorescence analysis
- IEC 61336 Nuclear instrumentation – Thickness measurement systems utilizing ionizing radiation – Definitions and test methods
- IEC 61337 Filters using waveguide type dielectric resonators
- IEC 61338 Waveguide type dielectric resonators
- IEC 61340 Electrostatics
- IEC 61341 Method of measurement of centre beam intensity and beam angle(s) of reflector lamps
- IEC 61343 Nuclear reactor instrumentation – Boiling light water reactors (BWR) – Measurements in the reactor vessel for monitoring adequate cooling within the core
- IEC 61345 UV test for photovoltaic (PV) modules (withdrawn)
- IEC 61346 Industrial systems, installations and equipment and industrial products – Structuring principles and reference designations (Withdrawn, replaced by IEC 81346)
- IEC 61347 Lamp control gear
- IEC TR 61352 Mnemonics and symbols for integrated circuits
- IEC 61355 Classification and designation of documents for plants, systems and equipment
- IEC 61360 Standard data element types with associated classification scheme
- IEC 61362 Guide to specification of hydraulic turbine control systems
- IEC 61363 Electrical installations of ships and mobile and fixed offshore units
- IEC TR 61364 Nomenclature for hydroelectric powerplant machinery
- IEC TR 61366 Hydraulic turbines, storage pumps and pump-turbines – Tendering Documents
- IEC TS 61370 Steam turbines – Steam purity
- IEC 61373 Railway applications – Rolling stock equipment – Shock and vibration tests
- IEC 61375 Electronic railway equipment – Train communication network (TCN)
- IEC 61377 Railway applications – Rolling stock – Combined test method for traction systems
- IEC 61378 Converter transformers
- IEC 61386 Conduit systems for cable management
- IEC TS 61390 Ultrasonics – Real-time pulse-echo systems – Test procedures to determine performance specifications
- IEC 61391 Ultrasonics – Pulse-echo scanners
- IEC 61394 Overhead lines – Requirements for greases for aluminium, aluminium alloy and steel bare conductors
- IEC 61395 Overhead electrical conductors – Creep test procedures for stranded conductors
- IEC 61400 Wind turbines
- IEC 61427 Secondary cells and batteries for renewable energy storage – General requirements and methods of test
- IEC 61429 Marking of secondary cells and batteries with the international recycling symbol ISO 7000-1135
- IEC TS 61430 Secondary cells and batteries – Test methods for checking the performance of devices designed for reducing explosion hazards – Lead-acid starter batteries
- IEC TR 61431 Guide for the use of monitor systems for lead-acid traction batteries
- IEC 61434 Secondary cells and batteries containing alkaline or other non-acid electrolytes – Guide to designation of current in alkaline secondary cell and battery standards
- IEC 61435 Nuclear instrumentation – High-purity germanium crystals for radiation detectors – Measurement methods of basic characteristics
- IEC TR 61438 Possible safety and health hazards in the use of alkaline secondary cells and batteries – Guide to equipment manufacturers and users
- IEC 61439 Low-voltage switchgear and control gear assemblies
- IEC 61442 Test methods for accessories for power cables with rated voltages from 6 kV (Um = 7,2 kV) up to 30 kV (Um = 36 kV)
- IEC 61443 Short-circuit temperature limits of electric cables with rated voltages above 30 kV (U_{m} = 36 kV)
- IEC 61445 Digital Test Interchange Format (DTIF)
- IEC 61452 Nuclear instrumentation – Measurement of gamma-ray emission rates of radionuclides – Calibration and use of germanium spectrometers
- IEC 61453 Nuclear instrumentation – Scintillation gamma ray detector systems for the assay of radionuclides – Calibration and routine tests
- IEC 61462 Composite hollow insulators – Pressurized and unpressurized insulators for use in electrical equipment with rated voltage greater than 1 000 V – Definitions, test methods, acceptance criteria and design recommendations
- IEC TS 61463 Bushings – Seismic qualification
- IEC TS 61464 Insulated bushings – Guide for the interpretation of dissolved gas analysis (DGA) in bushings where oil is the impregnating medium of the main insulation (generally paper)
- IEC 61466 Composite string insulator units for overhead lines with a nominal voltage greater than 1 000 V
- IEC 61467 Insulators for overhead lines – Insulator strings and sets for lines with a nominal voltage greater than 1 000 V – AC power arc tests
- IEC 61468 Nuclear power plants – In-core instrumentation – Characteristics and test methods of self-powered neutron detectors
- IEC 61472 Live working – Minimum approach distances for a.c. systems in the voltage range 72,5 kV to 800 kV – A method of calculation
- IEC 61477 Live working – Minimum requirements for the utilization of tools, devices and equipment
- IEC 61478 Live working – Ladders of insulating material
- IEC 61479 Live working – Flexible conductor covers (line hoses) of insulating material
- IEC 61481 Live working – Phase comparators
- IEC 61482 Live working – Protective clothing against the thermal hazards of an electric arc
- IEC 61496 Safety of machinery – Electro-sensitive protective equipment
- IEC 61497 Nuclear power plants – Electrical interlocks for functions important to safety – Recommendations for design and implementation
- IEC 61499 Function blocks
- IEC 61500 Nuclear power plants – Instrumentation and control important to safety – Data communication in systems performing category A functions
- IEC 61501 Nuclear reactor instrumentation – Wide range neutron fluence rate meter – Mean square voltage method
- IEC 61502 Nuclear power plants – Pressurized water reactors – Vibration monitoring of internal structures
- IEC 61504 Nuclear power plants – Instrumentation and control systems important to safety – Plant-wide radiation monitoring
- IEC 61506 Industrial-process measurement and control – Documentation of application software
- IEC 61508 Functional safety of electrical/electronic/programmable electronic safety-related systems
- IEC 61511 Functional safety – safety instrumented systems for the process industry sector
- IEC 61512 Batch control
- IEC 61513 Nuclear power plants – Instrumentation and control important to safety – General requirements for systems
- IEC 61514 Industrial process control systems – Methods of evaluating the performance of valve positioners with pneumatic outputs
- IEC 61515 Mineral insulated thermocouple cables and thermocouples
- IEC 61518 Mating dimensions between differential pressure (type) measuring instruments and flanged-on shut-off devices up to 413 BAR (41,3 MPa)
- IEC 61520 Metal thermowells for thermometer sensors – Functional dimensions
- IEC 61523 Delay and Power Calculation Standards
- IEC 61526 Radiation protection instrumentation – Measurement of personal dose equivalents Hp(10) and Hp(0,07) for X, gamma, neutron and beta radiations – Direct reading personal dose equivalent meters
- IEC 61534 Powertrack systems
- IEC 61535 Installation couplers intended for permanent connection in fixed installations
- IEC 61537 Cable management – Cable tray systems and cable ladder systems
- IEC 61540 Electrical accessories – Portable residual current devices without integral overcurrent protection for household and similar use (PRCDs)
- IEC 61543 Residual current-operated protective devices (RCDs) for household and similar use – Electromagnetic compatibility
- IEC 61545 Connecting devices – Devices for the connection of aluminium conductors in clamping units of any material and copper conductors in aluminium bodied clamping units
- IEC 61547 Equipment for general lighting purposes – EMC immunity requirements
- IEC 61549 Miscellaneous lamps
- IEC 61554 Panel-Mounted equipment – Electrical measuring instruments – Dimensions for panel mounting
- IEC 61557 Electrical safety in low voltage distribution systems up to 1 000 V a.c. and 1 500 V d.c. – Equipment for testing, measuring or monitoring of protective measures
- IEC 61558 Safety of power transformers, power supplies, reactors and similar products
- IEC 61559 Radiation protection instrumentation in nuclear facilities – Centralized systems for continuous monitoring of radiation and/or levels of radioactivity
- IEC 61560 Radiation protection instrumentation – Apparatus for non-destructive radiation tests of fur and other cloth samples
- IEC 61562 Radiation protection instrumentation – Portable equipment for measuring specific activity of beta-emitting radionuclides in foodstuffs
- IEC 61563 Radiation protection instrumentation – Equipment for measuring specific activity of gamma-emitting radionuclides in foodstuffs
- IEC 61566 Measurement of exposure to radio-frequency electromagnetic fields – Field strength in the frequency range 100 kHz to 1 GHz
- IEC 61577 Radiation protection instrumentation – Radon and radon decay product measuring instruments
- IEC 61578 Radiation protection instrumentation – Calibration and verification of the effectiveness of radon compensation for alpha and/or beta aerosol measuring instruments – Test methods
- IEC 61580 Measurement of return loss on waveguide and waveguide assemblies
- IEC 61582 Radiation protection instrumentation – In vivo counters – Classification, general requirements and test procedures for portable, transportable and installed equipment
- IEC 61584 Radiation protection instrumentation – Installed, portable or transportable assemblies – Measurement of air kerma direction and air kerma rate
- IEC TS 61586 Estimation of the reliability of electrical connectors
- IEC 61587 Mechanical structures for electronic equipment – Tests for IEC 60917 and IEC 60297 series
- IEC 61588 Precision clock synchronization protocol for networked measurement and control systems
- IEC 61591 Household range hoods – Methods for measuring performance
- IEC TR 61592 Household electrical appliances – Guidelines for consumer panel testing
- IEC 61595 Multichannel digital audio tape recorder (DATR), reel-to-reel system, for professional use
- IEC TR 61597 Overhead electrical conductors – Calculation methods for stranded bare conductors
- IEC 61599 Videodisk players – Methods of measurement
- IEC TR 61602 Connectors used in the field of audio, video and audiovisual engineering
- IEC 61603 Transmission of audio and/or video and related signals using infra-red radiation
- IEC TR 61604 Dimensions of uncoated ring cores of magnetic oxides (Withdrawn, replaced by IEC 62317-12:2016)
- IEC 61605 Fixed inductors for use in electronic and telecommunication equipment – Marking codes
- IEC 61606 Audio and audiovisual equipment – Digital audio parts – Basic measurement methods of audio characteristics
- IEC 61609 Microwave ferrite components – Guide for the drafting of specifications
- IEC 61610 Prints and transparencies produced from electronic sources – Assessment of image quality
- IEC 61619 Insulating liquids – Contamination by polychlorinated biphenyls (PCBs) – Method of determination by capillary column gas chromatography
- IEC 61620 Insulating liquids – Determination of the dielectric dissipation factor by measurement of the conductance and capacitance – Test method
- IEC 61621 Dry, solid insulating materials – Resistance test to high-voltage, low-current arc discharges
- IEC 61628 Corrugated pressboard and presspaper for electrical purposes
- IEC 61629 Aramid pressboard for electrical purposes
- IEC 61631 Test method for the mechanical strength of cores made of magnetic oxides
- IEC 61636 Software interface for Maintenance Information Collection and Analysis (SIMICA)
- IEC TR 61641 Enclosed low-voltage switchgear and controlgear assemblies – Guide for testing under conditions of arcing due to internal fault
- IEC 61642 Industrial a.c. networks affected by harmonics – Application of filters and shunt capacitors
- IEC 61643 Low-voltage surge protective devices
- IEC 61646 Thin-film terrestrial photovoltaic (PV) modules – Design qualification and type approval (Withdrawn, replaced by IEC 61215)
- IEC 61649 Weibull analysis
- IEC 61650 Reliability data analysis techniques – Procedures for comparison of two constant failure rates and two constant failure (event) intensities
- IEC 61660 Short-circuit currents in d.c. auxiliary installations in power plants and substations
- IEC 61666 Industrial systems, installations and equipment and industrial products – Identification of terminals within a system
- IEC 61669 Electroacoustics – Measurement of real-ear acoustical performance characteristics of hearing aids
- IEC 61671 Automatic Test Markup Language (ATML) for Exchanging Automatic Test Equipment and Test Information via XML
- IEC 61672 Electroacoustics – Sound level meters
- IEC 61674 Medical electrical equipment – Dosimeters with ionization chambers and/or semiconductor detectors as used in X-ray diagnostic imaging
- IEC 61675 Radionuclide imaging devices – Characteristics and test conditions
- IEC 61676 Medical electrical equipment – Dosimetric instruments used for non-invasive measurement of X-ray tube voltage in diagnostic radiology
- IEC 61683 Photovoltaic systems – Power conditioners – Procedure for measuring efficiency
- IEC 61685 Ultrasonics – Flow measurement systems – Flow test object
- IEC 61689 Ultrasonics – Physiotherapy systems – Field specifications and methods of measurement in the frequency range 0,5 MHz to 5 MHz
- IEC 61690 Electronic design interchange format (EDIF)
- IEC 61691 Behavioural languages
- IEC 61701 Salt mist corrosion testing of photovoltaic (PV) modules
- IEC 61703 Mathematical expressions for reliability, availability, maintainability and maintenance support terms
- IEC 61709 Electric components – Reliability – Reference conditions for failure rates and stress models for conversion
- IEC 61710 Power law model – Goodness-of-fit tests and estimation methods
- IEC 61724 Photovoltaic system performance
- IEC 61725 Analytical expression for daily solar profiles
- IEC 61726 Cable assemblies, cables, connectors and passive microwave components – Screening attenuation measurement by the reverberation chamber method
- IEC 61727 Photovoltaic (PV) systems – Characteristics of the utility interface
- IEC 61730 Photovoltaic (PV) module safety qualification
- IEC TR 61734 Application of symbols for binary logic and analogue elements
- IEC 61739 Integrated circuits
- IEC 61744 Calibration of fibre optic chromatic dispersion test sets
- IEC 61745 End-face image analysis procedure for the calibration of optical fibre geometry test sets
- IEC 61746 Calibration of optical time-domain reflectometers (OTDR)
- IEC 61747 Liquid crystal display devices
- IEC 61753 Fibre optic interconnecting devices and passive components – Performance standard
- IEC 61754 Fibre optic interconnecting devices and passive components – Fibre optic connector interfaces
- IEC 61755 Fibre optic interconnecting devices and passive components – Connector optical interfaces
- IEC 61756 Fibre optic interconnecting devices and passive components – Interface standard for fibre management systems
- IEC 61757 Fibre optic sensors
- IEC 61758 Fibre optic interconnecting devices and passive components – Interface standard for closures
- IEC 61760 Surface mounting technology
- IEC 61770 Electric appliances connected to the water mains – Avoidance of back-siphonage and failure of hose-sets
- IEC 61771 Nuclear power plants – Main control-room – Verification and validation of design
- IEC 61772 Nuclear power plants – Control rooms – Application of visual display units (VDUs)
- IEC 61773 Overhead lines – Testing of foundations for structures
- IEC TS 61774 Overhead lines – Meteorological data for assessing climatic loads
- IEC 61784 Industrial communication networks – Profiles
- IEC 61786 Measurement of DC magnetic, AC magnetic and AC electric fields from 1 Hz to 100 kHz with regard to exposure of human beings
- IEC 61788 Superconductivity
- IEC 61797 Transformers and inductors for use in telecommunication and electronic equipment – Main dimensions of coil formers
- IEC 61800 Adjustable speed electrical power drive systems
- IEC 61803 Determination of power losses in high-voltage direct current (HVDC) converter stations
- IEC TS 61804 Function blocks (FB) for process control
- IEC TR 61807 Magnetic properties of magnetically hard materials at elevated temperatures – Methods of measurement
- IEC 61810 Electromechanical elementary relays
- IEC 61811 Electromechanical telecom elementary relays of assessed quality
- IEC 61812 Time relays for industrial and residential use
- IEC TS 61813 Live working – Care, maintenance and in-service testing of aerial devices with insulating booms
- IEC 61817 Household portable appliances for cooking, grilling and similar use – Methods of measuring performance Household portable appliances for cooking, grilling and similar use – Methods for measuring performance
- IEC 61821 Electrical installations for lighting and beaconing of aerodromes – Maintenance of aeronautical ground lighting constant current series circuits
- IEC 61822 Electrical installations for lighting and beaconing of aerodromes – Constant current regulators
- IEC 61823 Electrical installations for lighting and beaconing of aerodromes – AGL series transformers
- IEC TS 61827 Electrical installations for lighting and beaconing of aerodromes – Characteristics of inset and elevated luminaires used on aerodromes and heliports
- IEC 61828 Ultrasonics – Focusing transducers – Definitions and measurement methods for the transmitted fields
- IEC 61829 Photovoltaic (PV) array – On-site measurement of current-voltage characteristics
- IEC TR 61831 On-line analyser systems – Guide to design and installation
- IEC TR 61832 Design and installation of on-line analyser systems – Guide to technical enquiry and bid evaluation
- IEC 61834 Recording – Helical-scan digital video cassette recording system using 6,35 mm magnetic tape for consumer use (525-60, 625–50, 1125–60 and 1250-50 systems)
- IEC 61835 Helical-scan digital component video cassette recording system using 12,65 mm (0,5 in) magnetic tape – Format D-5
- IEC TS 61836 Solar photovoltaic energy systems – Terms, definitions and symbols
- IEC 61837 Surface mounted piezoelectric devices for frequency control and selection – Standard outlines and terminal lead connections
- IEC TR 61838 Nuclear power plants – Instrumentation and control important to safety – Use of probabilistic safety assessment for the classification of functions
- IEC 61839 Nuclear power plants – Design of control rooms – Functional analysis and assignment
- IEC 61842 Microphones and earphones for speech communications
- IEC 61843 Measuring method for the level of intermodulation products generated in a gyromagnetic device
- IEC 61846 Ultrasonics – Pressure pulse lithotripters – Characteristics of fields
- IEC 61847 Ultrasonics – Surgical systems – Measurement and declaration of the basic output characteristics
- IEC 61850 Communication networks and systems for power utility automation
- IEC 61851 Electric vehicle conductive charging system
- IEC TR 61852 Medical electrical equipment – Digital imaging and communications in medicine (DICOM) – Radiotherapy objects
- IEC 61853 Photovoltaic (PV) module performance testing and energy rating
- IEC 61854 Overhead lines – Requirements and tests for spacers
- IEC 61855 Household electrical hair care appliances – Methods of measuring the performance
- IEC 61857 Electrical insulation systems
- IEC 61858 Electrical insulation systems – Thermal evaluation of modifications to an established electrical insulation system (EIS)
- IEC TR 61859 Guidelines for radiotherapy treatment rooms design
- IEC 61865 Overhead lines – Calculation of the electrical component of distance between live parts and obstacles – Method of calculation
- IEC 61866 Audiovisual systems – Interactive text transmission system (ITTS)
- IEC 61868 Mineral insulating oils – Determination of kinematic viscosity at very low temperatures
- IEC 61869 Instrument transformers
- IEC 61874 Nuclear instrumentation – Geophysical borehole instrumentation to determine rock density ('density logging')
- IEC 61880 Video systems (525/60) – Video and accompanied data using the vertical blanking interval – Analogue interface
- IEC 61881 Railway applications – Rolling stock equipment – Capacitors for power electronics
- IEC 61882 Hazard and operability studies (HAZOP studies) – Application guide
- IEC 61883 Consumer audio/video equipment – Digital interface
- IEC 61888 Nuclear power plants – Instrumentation important to safety – Determination and maintenance of trip setpoints
- IEC 61892 Mobile and fixed offshore units – Electrical installations
- IEC TS 61895 Ultrasonics – Pulsed Doppler diagnostic systems – Test procedures to determine performance
- IEC 61897 Overhead lines – Requirements and tests for Stockbridge type aeolian vibration dampers
- IEC TR 61901 Development tests recommended on cables with a longitudinally applied metal foil for rated voltages above 30 kV (U_{m} = 36 kV)
- IEC 61904 Video recording – Helical-scan digital component video cassette recording format using 12,65 mm magnetic tape and incorporating data compression (Format digital-L)
- IEC 61907 Communication network dependability engineering
- IEC TR 61908 The technology roadmap for industry data dictionary structure, utilization and implementation
- IEC 61909 Audio recording – Minidisc system
- IEC 61910 Medical electrical equipment – Radiation dose documentation
- IEC TR 61911 Live working – Guidelines for installation of distribution line conductors – Stringing equipment and accessory items (Withdrawn, replaced by IEC TR 61328:2017)
- IEC TR 61912 Low-voltage switchgear and control gear – Overcurrent protective devices
- IEC 61914 Cable cleats for electrical installations
- IEC 61915 Low-voltage switchgear and control gear – Device profiles for networked industrial devices
- IEC TR 61916 Electrical accessories – Harmonization of general rules
- IEC 61918 Industrial communication networks – Installation of communication networks in industrial premises
- IEC 61920 Infrared free air applications
- IEC 61921 Power capacitors – Low-voltage power factor correction banks
- IEC 61922 High-frequency induction heating installations – Test methods for the determination of power output of the generator
- IEC TR 61923 Household electrical appliances – Method of measuring performance – Assessment of repeatability and reproducibility
- IEC 61924 Maritime navigation and radiocommunication equipment and systems – Integrated navigation systems
- IEC 61925 Multimedia systems and equipment – Multimedia home server systems – Vocabulary of home server
- IEC 61926 Design automation
- IEC TR 61930 Fibre optic graphical symbology
- IEC TR 61931 Fibre optic – Terminology
- IEC TS 61934 Electrical insulating materials and systems – Electrical measurement of partial discharges (PD) under short rise time and repetitive voltage impulses
- IEC 61935 Specification for the testing of balanced and coaxial information technology cabling
- IEC 61936 Power installations exceeding 1 kV a.c.
- IEC 61937 Digital audio – Interface for non-linear PCM encoded audio bitstreams applying IEC 60958
- IEC 61938 Multimedia systems – Guide to the recommended characteristics of analogue interfaces to achieve interoperability
- IEC 61943 Integrated circuits – Manufacturing line approval application guideline
- IEC TS 61944 Integrated circuits – Manufacturing line approval – Demonstration vehicles
- IEC TS 61945 Integrated circuits – Manufacturing line approval – Methodology for technology and failure analysis
- IEC TR 61946 Mineral insulating oils – Characterization of paraffinic/naphthenic nature – Low temperature differential scanning calorimetry (DSC) test method
- IEC 61947 Electronic projection – Measurement and documentation of key performance criteria
- IEC TR 61948 Nuclear medicine instrumentation – Routine tests
- IEC TS 61949 Ultrasonics – Field characterization – In situ exposure estimation in finite-amplitude ultrasonic beams
- IEC 61950 Cable management systems – Specifications for conduit fittings and accessories for cable installations for extra heavy duty electrical steel conduit
- IEC 61951 Secondary cells and batteries containing alkaline or other non-acid electrolytes – Portable sealed rechargeable single cells
- IEC 61952 Insulators for overhead lines – Composite line post insulators for A.C. systems with a nominal voltage greater than 1 000 V – Definitions, test methods and acceptance criteria
- IEC 61954 Static var compensators (SVC) – Testing of thyristor valves
- IEC TS 61956 Methods of test for the evaluation of water treeing in insulating materials
- IEC 61959 Secondary cells and batteries containing alkaline or other non-acid electrolytes – Mechanical tests for sealed portable secondary cells and batteries
- IEC 61960 Secondary cells and batteries containing alkaline or other non-acid electrolytes – Secondary lithium cells and batteries for portable applications
- IEC 61964 Integrated circuits – Memory devices pin configurations
- IEC 61965 Mechanical safety of cathode ray tubes
- IEC 61966 Multimedia systems and equipment – Colour measurement and management
- IEC 61967 Integrated circuits – Measurement of electromagnetic emissions, 150 kHz to 1 GHz
- IEC 61968 Application integration at electric utilities – System interfaces for distribution management
- IEC 61969 Mechanical structures for electronic equipment – Outdoor enclosures
- IEC 61970 Energy management system application program interface (EMS-API)
- IEC TS 61973 High voltage direct current (HVDC) substation audible noise
- IEC 61975 High-voltage direct current (HVDC) installations – System tests
- IEC 61976 Nuclear instrumentation – Spectrometry – Characterization of the spectrum background in HPGe gamma-ray spectrometry
- IEC 61977 Fibre optic interconnecting devices and passive components – Fibre optic filters – Generic specification
- IEC 61978 Fibre optic interconnecting devices and passive components – Fibre optic passive chromatic dispersion compensators
- IEC 61980 Electric vehicle wireless power transfer (WPT) systems
- IEC 61982 Secondary batteries (except lithium) for the propulsion of electric road vehicles – Performance and endurance tests
- IEC 61984 Connectors – Safety requirements and tests
- IEC 61987 Industrial-process measurement and control – Data structures and elements in process equipment catalogues
- IEC 61988 Plasma display panels
- IEC 61991 Railway applications – Rolling stock – Protective provisions against electrical hazards
- IEC 61992 Railway applications – Fixed installations – DC switchgear
- IEC 61993 Maritime navigation and radiocommunication equipment and systems
- IEC TS 61994 Piezoelectric, dielectric and electrostatic devices and associated materials for frequency control, selection and detection – Glossary
- IEC 61995 Devices for the connection of luminaires for household and similar purposes
- IEC 61996 Maritime navigation and radiocommunication equipment and systems – Shipborne voyage data recorder (VDR)
- IEC TR 61997 Guidelines for the user interface in multimedia equipment for general purpose use
- IEC TR 61998 Model and framework for standardization in multimedia equipment and systems
- IEC TR 62000 Guidance for combining different single-mode fibres types
- IEC TR 62001 High-voltage direct current (HVDC) systems – Guidance to the specification and design evaluation of AC
- IEC 62002 Mobile and portable DVB-T/H radio access
- IEC 62003 Nuclear power plants – Instrumentation and control important to safety – Requirements for electromagnetic compatibility testing
- IEC 62004 Thermal-resistant aluminium alloy wire for overhead line conductor
- IEC 62005 Reliability of fibre optic interconnecting devices and passive components
- IEC 62006 Hydraulic machines – Acceptance tests of small hydroelectric installations
- IEC 62007 Semiconductor optoelectronic devices for fibre optic system applications
- IEC 62008 Performance characteristics and calibration methods for digital data acquisition systems and relevant software
- IEC TR 62010 Analyser systems – Guidance for maintenance management
- IEC 62011 Insulating materials – Industrial, rigid, moulded, laminated tubes and rods of rectangular and hexagonal cross-section based on thermosetting resins for electrical purposes
- IEC 62012 Multicore and symmetrical pair/quad cables for digital communications to be used in harsh environments
- IEC 62014 Electronic design automation libraries
- IEC 62014-4 IP-XACT – Standard Structure for Packaging, Integrating, and Reusing IP within Tool Flows
- IEC 62014-5 Quality of Electronic and Software Intellectual Property Used in System and System on Chip (SoC) Designs
- IEC 62018 Power consumption of information technology equipment – Measurement methods
- IEC 62019 Electrical accessories – Circuit-breakers and similar equipment for household use – Auxiliary contact units
- IEC 62020 Electrical accessories – Residual current monitors for household and similar uses (RCMs)
- IEC 62021 Insulating liquids – Determination of acidity
- IEC 62022 Installed monitors for the control and detection of gamma radiations contained in recyclable or non-recyclable materials transported by vehicles
- IEC 62023 Structuring of technical information and documentation
- IEC 62024 High frequency inductive components – Electrical characteristics and measuring methods
- IEC 62025 High frequency inductive components – Non-electrical characteristics and measuring methods
- IEC 62026 Low-voltage switchgear and control gear – Controller-device interfaces (CDIs)
- IEC 62027 Preparation of object lists, including parts lists
- IEC 62028 General methods of measurement for digital television receivers
- IEC 62031 LED modules for general lighting – Safety specifications
- IEC 62032 Guide for the Application, Specification and Testing of Phase-Shifting Transformers
- IEC 62033 Attenuation uniformity in optical fibres
- IEC 62034 Automatic test systems for battery powered emergency escape lighting
- IEC 62035 Discharge lamps (excluding fluorescent lamps) – Safety specifications
- IEC 62036 Mineral insulating oils – Oxidation stability test method based on differential scanning calorimetry (DSC)
- IEC 62037 Passive RF and microwave devices, intermodulation level measurement
- IEC TR 62039 Selection guide for polymeric materials for outdoor use under HV stress
- IEC 62040 Uninterruptible power systems (UPS)
- IEC 62041 Transformers, power supplies, reactors and similar products – EMC requirements
- IEC 62044 Cores made of soft magnetic materials – Measuring methods
- IEC TS 62045 Multimedia security – Guideline for privacy protection of equipment and systems in and out of use
- IEC TS 62046 Safety of machinery – Application of protective equipment to detect the presence of persons
- IEC 62047 Semiconductor devices – Micro-electromechanical devices
- IEC TR 62048 Optical fibres – Reliability – Power law theory
- IEC TR 62051 Electricity metering – Data exchange for meter reading, tariff and load control – Glossary of terms
- IEC 62052 Electricity metering equipment (a.c.) – General requirements, tests and test conditions
- IEC 62053 Electricity metering equipment (a.c.) – Particular requirements
- IEC 62054 Electricity metering (a.c.) – Tariff and load control
- IEC 62055 Electricity metering – Payment systems
- IEC 62056 Electricity metering data exchange – The DLMS/COSEM suite
- IEC 62057-1 Electrical energy meters – Test equipment, techniques and procedures – Part 1: Stationary meter test units (MTUs)
- IEC 62057-3 Electrical energy meters – Test equipment, techniques and procedures – Part 3: Automatic meter testing system (AMTS)
- IEC 62058 Electricity metering equipment (AC) – Acceptance inspection
- IEC 62059 Electricity metering equipment – Dependability
- IEC 62060 Secondary cells and batteries – Monitoring of lead acid stationary batteries – User guide
- IEC 62061 Safety of machinery: Functional safety of electrical, electronic and programmable electronic control systems
- IEC TR 62063 High-voltage switchgear and control gear – The use of electronic and associated technologies in auxiliary equipment of switchgear and control gear
- IEC 62065 Maritime navigation and radiocommunication equipment and systems – Track control systems – Operational and performance requirements, methods of testing and required test results
- IEC TR 62066 Surge overvoltages and surge protection in low-voltage a.c. power systems – General basic information
- IEC 62067 Power cables with extruded insulation and their accessories for rated voltages above 150 kV (U_{m} = 170 kV) up to 500 kV (U_{m} = 550 kV) – Test methods and requirements
- IEC 62068 Electrical insulating materials and systems – General method of evaluation of electrical endurance under repetitive voltage impulses
- IEC 62070 Broadcast digital video tape recorders – Identification method for recording and/or reproduction error status
- IEC 62071 Helical-scan compressed digital video cassette system using 6,35 mm magnetic tape – Format D-7
- IEC TS 62073 Guidance on the measurement of hydrophobicity of insulator surfaces
- IEC 62074 Fibre optic interconnecting devices and passive components – Fibre optic WDM devices
- IEC 62075 Audio/video, information and communication technology equipment – Environmentally conscious design
- IEC 62076 Industrial electroheating installations – Test methods for induction channel and induction crucible furnaces
- IEC 62077 Fibre optic interconnecting devices and passive components – Fibre optic circulators – Generic specification
- IEC 62080 Sound signalling devices for household and similar purposes
- IEC 62083 Medical electrical equipment – Requirements for the safety of radiotherapy treatment planning systems
- IEC 62087 Audio, video, and related equipment – Determination of power consumption
- IEC 62088 Nuclear instrumentation – Photodiodes for scintillation detectors – Test procedures
- IEC 62089 Nuclear instrumentation – Calibration and usage of alpha/beta gas proportional counters
- IEC 62090 Product package labels for electronic components using bar code and two-dimensional symbologies
- IEC 62091 Low-voltage switchgear and control gear – Controllers for drivers of stationary fire pumps
- IEC 62093 Balance-of-system components for photovoltaic systems – Design qualification natural environments
- IEC 62094 Indicator light units for household and similar fixed-electrical installations
- IEC TR 62095 Electric cables – Calculations for current ratings – Finite element method
- IEC TR 62096 Nuclear power plants – Instrumentation and control important to safety – Guidance for the decision on modernization
- IEC 62097 Hydraulic machines, radial and axial – Performance conversion method from model to prototype
- IEC TS 62098 Evaluation methods for microprocessor- based instruments
- IEC 62099 Fibre optic wavelength switches – Generic specification
- IEC TS 62100 Cables for aeronautical ground lighting primary circuits
- IEC TS 62101 Electrical insulation systems – Short-time evaluation of combined thermal and electrical stresses
- IEC TS 62102 Electrical safety – Classification of interfaces for equipment to be connected to information and communications technology networks
- IEC 62104 Characteristics of DAB receivers
- IEC 62105 Digital audio broadcast system – Specification of the receiver data interface (RDI)
- IEC 62106 Specification of the radio data system (RDS) for VHF/FM sound broadcasting in the frequency range from 87,5 MHz to 108,0 MHz
- IEC 62107 Super video compact disc – Disc-interchange system-specification
- IEC 62108 Concentrator photovoltaic (CPV) modules and assemblies – Design qualification and type approval
- IEC 62109 Safety of power converters for use in photovoltaic power systems
- IEC 62110 Electric and magnetic field levels generated by AC power systems – Measurement procedures with regard to public exposure
- IEC 62115 Electric toys – Safety
- IEC 62116 Utility-interconnected photovoltaic inverters – Test procedure of islanding prevention measures
- IEC 62117 Nuclear reactor instrumentation – Pressurized light water reactors (PWR) – Monitoring adequate cooling within the core during cold shutdown
- IEC 62121 Methods of measurement for minidisc recorders/players
- IEC 62122 Methods of measurement for consumer-use digital VTRs – Electronic and mechanical performances
- IEC 62124 Photovoltaic (PV) stand alone systems – Design verification
- IEC TR 62125 Environmental statement specific to IEC TC 20 – Electric cables
- IEC 62127 Ultrasonics – Hydrophones
- IEC 62128 Railway applications – Fixed installations – Electrical safety, earthing and the return circuit
- IEC 62129 Calibration of wavelength/optical frequency measurement instruments
- IEC TR 62130 Climatic field data including validation
- IEC TR 62131 Environmental conditions – Vibration and shock of electrotechnical equipment
- IEC 62132 Integrated circuits – Measurement of electromagnetic immunity
- IEC 62133 Secondary cells and batteries containing alkaline or other non-acid electrolytes – Safety requirements for portable sealed secondary cells, and for batteries made from them, for use in portable applications
- IEC 62134 Fibre optic interconnecting devices and passive components – Fibre optic closures
- IEC 62135 Resistance welding equipment
- IEC 62137 Surface mounting technology – Environmental and endurance test methods for surface mount solder joint
- IEC 62138 Nuclear power plants – Instrumentation and control important for safety – Software aspects for computer-based systems performing category B or C functions
- IEC 62141 Helical-scan digital video cassette recording format using 12,65 mm magnetic tape and incorporating MPEG-4 compression – Type D-16 format
- IEC TS 62143 Electrical installations for lighting and beaconing of aerodromes – Aeronautical ground lighting systems – Guidelines for the development of a safety lifecycle methodology
- IEC 62146 Grading capacitors for high-voltage alternating current circuit-breakers
- IEC 62148 Fibre optic active components and devices – Package and interface standards
- IEC 62149 Fibre optic active components and devices – Performance standards
- IEC 62150 Fibre optic active components and devices – Test and measurement procedures
- IEC 62151 Safety of equipment electrically connected to a telecommunication network
- IEC TR 62152 Transmission properties of cascaded two-ports or quadripols – Background of terms and definitions
- IEC 62153 Metallic communication cables test methods
- IEC 62155 Hollow pressurized and unpressurized ceramic and glass insulators for use in electrical equipment with rated voltages greater than 1 000 V
- IEC 62156 Digital video recording with video compression 12,65 mm type D-9 component format 525/60 and 625/50 (Digital S)
- IEC TR 62157 Cylindrical machined carbon electrodes – Nominal dimensions
- IEC PAS 62162 Field-induced charged-device model test method for electrostatic discharge withstand thresholds of microelectronic components
- IEC TR 62188 Secondary cells and batteries containing alkaline or other non-acid electrolytes – Design and manufacturing recommendations for portable batteries made from sealed secondary cells
- IEC 62192 Live working – Insulating ropes
- IEC 62193 Live working – Telescopic sticks and telescopic measuring sticks
- IEC 62194 Method of evaluating the thermal performance of enclosures
- IEC 62196 Plugs, socket-outlets, vehicle connectors and vehicle inlets – Conductive charging of electric vehicles
- IEC 62197 Connectors for electronic equipment – Quality assessment requirements
- IEC 62198 Managing risk in projects – Application guidelines
- IEC 62208 Empty enclosures for low-voltage switchgear and control gear assemblies – General requirements
- IEC 62209 Human exposure to radio frequency fields from hand-held and body-mounted wireless communication devices – Human models, instrumentation, and procedures
- IEC 62211 Inductive components – Reliability management
- IEC 62215 Integrated circuits – Measurement of impulse immunity
- IEC 62216 Digital terrestrial television receivers for the DVB-T system
- IEC 62217 Polymeric HV insulators for indoor and outdoor use – General definitions, test methods and acceptance criteria
- IEC 62219 Overhead electrical conductors – Formed wire, concentric lay, stranded conductors
- IEC 62220 Medical electrical equipment – Characteristics of digital X-ray imaging devices
- IEC TR 62221 Optical fibres – Measurement methods – Microbending sensitivity
- IEC TR 62222 Fire performance of communication cables installed in buildings
- IEC 62223 Insulators – Glossary of terms and definitions
- IEC TS 62224 Multimedia home server systems – Conceptual model for digital rights management
- IEC 62226 Exposure to electric or magnetic fields in the low and intermediate frequency range – Methods for calculating the current density and internal electric field induced in the human body
- IEC 62227 Multimedia home server systems – Digital rights permission code
- IEC 62228 Integrated circuits – EMC evaluation of transceivers
- IEC TS 62229 Multimedia systems and equipment – Multimedia e-publishing and e-book – Conceptual model for multimedia e-publishing
- IEC 62230 Electric cables – Spark-test method
- IEC 62231 Composite station post insulators for substations with AC voltages greater than 1 000 V up to 245 kV
- IEC 62232 Determination of RF field strength, power density and SAR in the vicinity of radiocommunication base stations for the purpose of evaluating human exposure
- IEC 62233 Measurement methods for electromagnetic fields of household appliances and similar apparatus with regard to human exposure
- IEC TR 62235 Nuclear facilities – Instrumentation and control systems important to safety – Systems of interim storage and final repository of nuclear fuel and waste
- IEC 62236 Railway applications – Electromagnetic compatibility
- IEC 62237 Live working – Insulating hoses with fittings for use with hydraulic tools and equipment
- IEC 62238 Maritime navigation and radiocommunication equipment and systems – VHF radiotelephone equipment incorporating Class "D" Digital Selective Calling (DSC) – Methods of testing and required test results
- IEC TS 62239 Process management for avionics – Management plan
- IEC TR 62240 Process management for avionics – Electronic components capability in operation
- IEC 62241 Nuclear power plants – Main control room – Alarm functions and presentation
- IEC 62243 Artificial Intelligence Exchange and Service Tie to All Test Environments (AI-ESTATE)
- IEC 62244 Radiation protection instrumentation – Installed radiation monitors for the detection of radioactive and special nuclear materials at national borders
- IEC 62246 Reed switches
- IEC TR 62251 Multimedia systems and equipment – Quality assessment – Audio-video communication systems
- IEC 62253 Photovoltaic pumping systems – Design qualification and performance measurements
- IEC 62255 Multicore and symmetrical pair/quad cables for broadband digital communications (high bit rate digital access telecommunication networks) – Outside plant cables
- IEC 62256 Hydraulic turbines, storage pumps and pump-turbines – Rehabilitation and performance improvement
- IEC TS 62257 Recommendations for renewable energy and hybrid systems for rural electrification
- IEC 62258 Semiconductor die products
- IEC 62259 Secondary cells and batteries containing alkaline or other non-acid electrolytes – Nickel-cadmium prismatic secondary single cells with partial gas recombination
- IEC 62262 Degrees of protection provided by enclosures for electrical equipment against external mechanical impacts (IK code)
- IEC TR 62263 Live working – Guidelines for the installation and maintenance of optical fibre cables on overhead power lines
- IEC 62264 Enterprise-control system integration
- IEC 62265 Advanced Library Format (ALF) describing Integrated Circuit (IC) technology, cells and blocks (withdrawn)
- IEC 62267 Railway applications – Automated urban guided transport (AUGT) – Safety requirements
- IEC 62270 Guide for computer-based control for hydroelectric power plant automation
- IEC 62271 High-voltage switchgear and control gear
- IEC 62272 Digital radio mondiale (DRM)
- IEC 62273 Methods of measurement for radio transmitters
- IEC 62274 Medical electrical equipment – Safety of radiotherapy record and verify systems
- IEC 62275 Cable management systems – Cable ties for electrical installations
- IEC 62276 Single crystal wafers for surface acoustic wave (SAW) device applications – Specifications and measuring methods
- IEC 62278 Railway applications – Specification and demonstration of reliability, availability, maintainability and safety (RAMS)
- IEC 62279 Railway applications – Communication, signalling and processing systems – Software for railway control and protection systems
- IEC 62280 Railway applications – Communication, signalling and processing systems – Safety related communication in transmission systems
- IEC 62281 Safety of primary and secondary lithium cells and batteries during transport
- IEC 62282 Fuel cell technologies
- IEC TR 62283 Optical fibres – Guidance for nuclear radiation tests
- IEC TR 62284 Effective area measurements of single-mode optical fibres – Guidance
- IEC TR 62285 Application guide for non-linear coefficient measuring methods
- IEC 62286 Service diagnostic interface for consumer electronics products and networks – Implementation for IEEE 1394
- IEC 62287 Maritime navigation and radiocommunication equipment and systems – Class B shipborne equipment of the automatic identification system (AIS)
- IEC 62288 Maritime navigation and radiocommunication equipment and systems – Presentation of navigation-related information on shipborne navigational displays – General requirements, methods of testing and required test results
- IEC 62289 Video recording – Helical-scan digital video cassette recording format using 12,65 mm magnetic tape and incorporating MPEG-2 Compression – Format D-10
- IEC 62290 Railway applications – Urban guided transport management and command/control systems
- IEC TR 62291 Multimedia data storage – Application program interface for UDF based file systems
- IEC 62295 Multimedia systems – Common communication protocol for inter-connectivity on heterogeneous networks
- IEC TR 62296 Considerations of unaddressed safety aspects in the second edition of IEC 60601-1 and proposals for new requirements
- IEC 62297 Triggering messages for broadcast applications
- IEC 62298 Teleweb application
- IEC 62300 Consumer audio/video equipment digital interface with plastic optical fibre
- IEC 62301 Household electrical appliances – Measurement of standby power
- IEC 62304 Medical Device Software – Software Life Cycle Processes
- IEC 62305 Protection Against Lightning
- IEC 62310 Static Transfer Systems (STS)
- IEC 62325 Standards related to energy market models & communications
- IEC TR 62331 Pulsed field magnetometry
- IEC 62351 Power System Control and Associated Communications – Data and Communication Security
- IEC 62353 Medical electrical equipment – Recurrent test and test after repair of medical electrical equipment
- IEC/TR 62357 Power system control and associated communications – Reference architecture for object models, services and protocols
- IEC 62365 Digital audio – Digital input-output interfacing – Transmission of digital audio over asynchronous transfer mode (ATM) networks
- IEC 62366 Medical devices – Application of usability engineering to medical devices
- IEC 62368 Audio/video, information and communication technology equipment
- IEC 62379 Common control interface for networked digital audio and video products
- IEC 62384 DC or AC supplied electronic control gear for LED modules – Performance requirements
- IEC 62386 Digital addressable lighting interface
- IEC 62388 Maritime Navigation and Radio Communications, Shipborne Radar
- IEC 62395 Electrical resistance trace heating systems for industrial and commercial applications
- IEC 62420 Concentric lay stranded overhead electrical conductors containing one or more gap(s)
- IEC 62425 Railway applications - Communication, signalling and processing systems - Safety related electronic systems for signalling
- IEC 62439 Industrial communication networks – High availability automation networks
- IEC 62443 Industrial communication networks – Network and system security
- IEC 62446 Grid connected photovoltaic systems – Minimum requirements for system documentation, commissioning tests and inspection
- IEC 62455 Internet protocol (IP) and transport stream (TS) based service access
- IEC 62464 Magnetic resonance equipment for medical imaging
- IEC 62471 Photobiological safety of lamps and lamp systems
- IEC 62474 Material declaration for products of and for the electrotechnical industry
- IEC 62477 Safety requirements for power electronic converter systems and equipment
- IEC 62481 Digital Living Network Alliance (DLNA) home networked device interoperability guidelines
- IEC 62491 Industrial systems, installations and equipment and industrial products – Labelling of cables and cores
- IEC 62493 Assessment of lighting equipment related to human exposure to electromagnetic fields
- IEC 62502 Analysis techniques for dependability – Event tree analysis (ETA)
- IEC 62504 General lighting – Light emitting diode (LED) products and related equipment – Terms and definitions
- IEC 62505 Railway applications – Fixed installations – Particular requirements for a.c. switchgear
- IEC 62507 Identification systems enabling unambiguous information interchange – Requirements
- IEC 62531 Property Specification Language (PSL)
- IEC TS 62556 Ultrasonics – Field characterization – Specification and measurement of field parameters for high intensity therapeutic ultrasound (HITU) transducers and systems
- IEC 62560 Self-ballasted LED-lamps for general lighting services by voltage > 50 V – Safety specifications
- IEC 62561 Lightning protection system components (LPSC)
- IEC 62600 Marine energy - Wave, tidal and other water current converters.
- IEC 62605 Multimedia systems and equipment – Multimedia e-publishing and e-books – Interchange format for e-dictionaries
- IEC 62606 General requirements for arc fault detection devices
- IEC 62612 Self-ballasted LED lamps for general lighting services with supply voltages > 50 V – Performance requirements
- IEC 62645 Nuclear power plants - Instrumentation, control and electrical power systems - cybersecurity requirement
- IEC 62680 Universal Serial Bus (USB) interfaces for data and power
- IEC 62682 Management of alarm systems for the process industries
- IEC 62684 Interoperability specifications of common external power supply (EPS) for use with data-enabled mobile telephones
- IEC/TR 62685 Industrial communication networks – Profiles – Assessment guideline for safety devices using IEC 61784-3 functional safety communication profiles (FSCPs)
- IEC 62693 Industrial electroheating installations – Test methods for infrared electroheating installations
- IEC 62700 DC Power supply for notebook computer
- IEC 62703 Expression of performance of fluorometric oxygen analyzers in liquid media
- IEC 62708 Documents kinds for electrical and instrumentation projects in the process industry
- IEC 62717 LED modules for general lighting – Performance requirements
- IEC 62734 Industrial networks – Wireless communication network and communication profiles – ISA 100.11a
- IEC 62752 In-cable control and protection device for mode 2 charging of electric roadvehicles
- IEC 62769 Field device integration (FDI)
- IEC 62776 Double-capped LED lamps designed to retrofit linear fluorescent lamps – Safety specifications
- IEC/TR 62794 Industrial-process measurement, control and automation – Reference model for representation of production facilities (digital factory)
- IEC/TR 62795 Interoperation guide of field device tool (FDT) / device type manager (DTM) and electronic device description language (EDDL)
- IEC/TS 62796 Energy efficiency in electroheating installations
- IEC 62798 Industrial electroheating equipment – Test methods for infrared emitters
- IEC/TR 62837 Energy efficiency through automation systems
- IEC 62840 Electric vehicle battery swap system
- IEC 62859 Nuclear power plants – Instrumentation and control systems – Requirements for coordinating safety and cybersecurity
- IEC 62881 Cause and Effect Matrix
- IEC 62885 Dry vacuum cleaners for household or similar use – Methods for measuring the performance
- IEC/TS 62872 Industrial-process measurement, control and automation system interface between industrial facilities and the smart grid
- IEC/TR 62914 Secondary cells and batteries containing alkaline or other non-acid electrolytes – Experimental procedure for the forced internal short-circuit test of IEC 62133:2012
- IEC/PAS 62948 Industrial networks – Wireless communication network and communication profiles – WIA-FA
- IEC/PAS 62953 Industrial communication networks – Fieldbus specifications – ADS-net
- IEC 63096 - Nuclear power plants – Instrumentation, control and electrical power systems – Security controls
- IEC 63110 Protocol for the management of electric vehicles charging and discharging infrastructures
- IEC 63119 Protocol for information exchange for electric vehicle charging roaming services
- IEC 63382 Protocol for the management of distributed energy storage systems based on electric vehicles
- IEC/TS 63383 Cybersecurity aspects of devices used for power metering and monitoring, power quality monitoring, data collection and analysis
- IEC/TS 63384 Power System Stability Control
- IEC/TR 63385 Transmitting and receiving equipment for radiocommunication
- IEC/PAS 63386 CONDUCTIVE CHARGING OF ELECTRIC VEHICLE
- IEC 63387 Hybrid CPV/PV modules
- IEC/TS 63389 Developing a profile composed of a set of Basic Application Profiles (BAPs) of IEC 61850 for DER compliant to IEEE 1547
- IEC/TS 63390 Technical Specifications for Digitalization of Operation and Maintenance in Hydropower Assets
- IEC 63391 General technical requirements for millimeter wave holographic imaging body scanner
- IEC/TS 63392 Fire test for concentrator PV modules
- IEC/TR 63393 Electrical systems for electric road vehicles and electric industrial trucks
- IEC/TS 63394 Safety of machinery – Guidelines on functional safety of safety-related control system
- IEC 63395 Sustainable management of waste electrical and electronic equipment (e-waste).
- IEC/TS 63397 Guidelines for qualifying PV modules for increased hail resistance
- IEC/TS 63398 Technical Specification for Black Start of Hydropower Plant
- IEC 63399 Household and similar use electrical rice cookers - Methods for measuring the performance
- IEC/TR 63401 Dynamic characteristics of inverter-based resources in bulk power systems
- IEC 63402 Energy Efficiency Systems - Smart Grid - Customer Energy Management Systems - General Requirements and Architecture
- IEC 63403 LED packages for horticultural lighting
- IEC 63404 Switchgear and controlgear and their assemblies for low voltage – Integration method of radiocommunication device into an equipment
- IEC 63405 High-voltage test techniques - Dielectric loss measurements "PROPOSED HORIZONTAL STANDARD"
- IEC/TS 63406 Generic RMS simulation models of converter-based generating units for power system dynamic analysis
- IEC 63407 Conductive charging of electric vehicles - Contact interface for automated connection device (ACD)
- IEC/SRD 63408 Safety Aspects – Guideline for Adult AAL Care Recipients in standards and other specifications
- IEC 63409 Photovoltaic power generating systems connection with grid
- IEC/TR 63410 Decentralized electrical energy systems roadmap
- IEC/TR 63411 Grid Connection of Offshore Wind via VSC-HVDC System
- IEC 63412 Ultrasonics - Shear-wave elastography
- IEC 63413 Nuclear Power Plants - Instrumentation and control systems important to safety - Platform qualification
- IEC/TS 63414 Artificial pollution tests on high-voltage insulators made of hydrophobicity transfer materials to be used on a.c. and d.c. systems
- IEC/TR 63415 Nuclear Power plants – Instrumentation and control systems – Use of formal security models for I&C security architecture design and assessment
- IEC/SRD 63416 Ethical considerations of AI when Applied in the Active Assisted Living (AAL) context
- IEC/TS 63417 Guide and plan to develop a unified IEC Smart energy Ontology
- IEC 63418 Fixed accessories intended for household and similar purposes that supply power through an interface
- IEC 63419 Guideline for Switching Reliability Evaluation procedures for Gallium Nitride Power Conversion Devices
- IEC/SRD 63420 Cooperative Multiple Systems in Connected Home Environments – AAL SOTIF of E/E Systems
- IEC 63423 Nuclear Power Plants - Instrumentation and control systems important to safety - Cable assemblies for Harsh Environment Purposes
- IEC/TR 63424 Validation of dynamic power control and exposure time-averaging algorithms
- IEC/TR 63425 Connectivity for Lighting Systems
- IEC 63584 Open Charge Point Protocol (OCPP)
- IEC 80000 Quantities and units
- IEC 80001 Application of risk management for IT-networks incorporating medical devices
- IEC/TR 80002 Medical device software
- IEC/TS 80004 Nanotechnologies
- IEC/IEEE 80005 Utility connections in port
- IEC 80369 Small-bore connectors for liquids and gases in healthcare applications
- IEC 80416 Basic principles for graphical symbols for use on equipment
- IEC 80601 Medical electrical equipment
- IEC 81346 Industrial systems, installations and equipment and industrial products – Structuring principles and reference designations
- IEC 81714 Design of graphical symbols for use in the technical documentation of products
- IEC 82045 Document management
- IEC 82079 Preparation of instructions for use – Structuring, content and presentation
- IEC 82304 Health software
- IEC 88528 Reciprocating internal combustion engine driven alternating current generating sets

== See also ==
- Category:IEC standards
- List of IEC technical committees
- List of ISO standards – covers also standards jointly published by the International Organization for Standardization and the IEC
