= 60601 =

60601 may refer to:

- The year in the 61st millennium
- The Chicago Loop
- IEC60601, a series of international standards related to medical devices.
