= IEC 62366 =

Medical software standard

IEC 62366 medical devices - Application of usability engineering to medical devices is an international standard published by the International Electrotechnical Commission (IEC). The standard specifies usability requirements for the development of medical devices. It has been adopted as national standards and therefore can be used as a benchmark to comply with regulatory requirements.

== Summary of IEC 62366 ==
The IEC 62366 standard aims to reduce errors caused by inadequate medical device usability. Such errors have become an increasing cause for concern. IEC 62366 is a process-based standard that aims to help manufacturers of medical devices to design for high usability. It does not address clinical decision-making related to use of the device. The standard will replace ISO/IEC 60601-1-6: Medical electrical equipment - Part 1-6: General requirements for safety - Collateral standard: Usability. Manufacturers of medical electrical equipment who comply with IEC 60601-1-6 need to also comply by extension to IEC 62366 as part of IEC 60601-1 Edition 3.1.

== History of IEC 62366 ==
IEC 62366 was initially published in 2007. In February 2015, IEC 62366-1:2015 was published – Medical devices - Part 1: Application of usability engineering to medical devices – focused on usability as it relates to safety. In May 2016, IEC/TR 62366-2 was published – Medical devices - Part 2: Guidance on the application of usability engineering to medical devices – focused on goals other than safety.

== See also ==
- International Electrotechnical Commission (IEC)
- List of IEC standards
- IEC 60601
