= IEC 63119 =

IEC 63119 is an international standard defining a protocol for information exchange for electric vehicle charging roaming services, which is currently under development. IEC 63119 is one of the International Electrotechnical Commission's group of standards for electric road vehicles and electric industrial trucks, and is the responsibility of Working Group 9 (WG9) of IEC Technical Committee 69 (TC69).

== Standard documents ==
IEC 63119 consists of the following parts, detailed in separate IEC 63119 standard documents:

- IEC 63119-1: General, edition 1 published in 2019.
- IEC 63119-2: Use cases
- IEC 63119-3: Message structure
- IEC 63119-4: Cybersecurity and information privacy

== See also ==
- IEC 63110
