= IEC 61108 =

IEC 61108 is a collection of IEC standards for "Maritime navigation and radiocommunication equipment and systems - Global navigation satellite systems (GNSS)".

The 61108 standards are developed in Working Group 4 (WG 4A) of Technical Committee 80 (TC80) of the IEC.

== Sections of IEC 61108 ==
Standard IEC 61108 is divided into seven parts, each relating to a different GNSS system's receiver equipment, performance requirements, methods of testing, and required test results:

- IEC 61108-1: Global positioning system (GPS) equipment
- IEC 61108-2: Global navigation satellite system (GLONASS) equipment
- IEC 61108-3: Galileo equipment
- IEC 61108-4: Shipborne DGPS and DGLONASS maritime radio beacons
- IEC 61108-5: BeiDou equipment
- IEC 61108-6: Indian Regional Navigation Satellite System (IRNSS) equipment
- IEC 61108-7: Satellite-Based Augmentation System (SBAS) equipment

== IMO Resolutions ==
The International Maritime Organization (IMO) has made several resolutions on performance standards of shipborne GNSS receivers, corresponding to the IEC standards for different GNSS constellations and receiver equipment.

On 1 December 2000, the International Maritime Organization (IMO) adopted three resolutions regarding the performance standards for shipborne GNSS receivers:

- IMO RESOLUTION MSC.112(73), corresponding to the IEC 61108-1 test standard
- IMO RESOLUTION MSC.113(73), corresponding to the IEC 61108-2 test standard
- IMO RESOLUTION MSC.114(73), corresponding to the IEC 61108-4 test standard

On 5 December 2006, a fourth resolution was adopted:

- IMO RESOLUTION MSC.233(82), corresponding to the IEC 61108-3 standard

Further resolutions include IMO Resolution A.1046(27).
