= ATML =

XML markup language

Automatic Test Markup Language (ATML) is a collection of XML schemas that allows automatic test systems (ATS) to exchange test information in a common format adhering to the XML standard.

The purpose of ATML is to support test programs, test asset, and unit under test (UUT) interoperability within an automatic test environment. ATML accomplishes this through a standard medium for exchanging UUT, test, and diagnostic information between the various components of the test system.

The family of standards are developed by IEEE Standards Coordinating Committee 20 (SCC20) and are composed of:

- ATML IEEE Standard 1671 - Base Standard
  - Test Description - IEEE 1671.1
  - Instrument Description - IEEE 1671.2
  - Unit Under Test (UUT) Description - IEEE 1671.3
  - Test Configuration Description - IEEE 1671.4
  - Test Adaptor Description - IEEE 1671.5
  - Test Station Description - IEEE 1671.6
  - Signal and Test Definition - IEEE 1641
  - Test Results - IEEE 1636.1

Typically ATML information would be used in the following scenarios:

- Data that will be utilized for the design, development, and utilization of automatic test equipment
- Data that will be utilized for the design, development, and utilization of test program sets to test a product on specific test equipment
- Product design data that will be utilized during the testing of the product
- Shared usage of maintenance data and the results of testing a product
- Testing requirements of a particular product
- Data that will be utilized for the design, development, and utilization of instrumentation that will be utilized within a particular test system configuration
- A definition of allowable automatic test system configurations that can be used to test and evaluate a particular product
- A definition of the capabilities of automatic test systems as well as the resources within the test systems
- Recording and exchanging values of measurements and tests

== See also ==
Test automation
