= IEC 60204 =

IEC standard

IEC 60204-1 / EN 60204 Safety of machinery – Electrical equipment of machines – Part 1: General requirements

This is a standard published by the International Electrotechnical Commission (IEC), published in parallel by CENELEC (European Committee for Electrotechnical Standardization).

== Content ==
The standard contains the following:

- Electrical Supply Requirements;
- electromagnetic compatibility (EMC) requirements;
- over current and over voltage protection requirements;
- requirements for determination of the short circuit current rating of the electrical equipment;
- protective bonding requirements, terminology, and protection against electric shock;
- Incoming supply requirements and switching;
- requirements pertaining to safe torque off, emergency stop, and control circuit protection;
- symbols for actuators of control devices;
- testing requirements;
- marking and documentation requirements.

== Scope ==
IEC 60204-1 is scoped to cover the electrical equipment of machines that operate in the low-voltage range, generally accepted to be 1000 V a.c. or less, or 1500 V d.c. or less. Equipment within the scope is typically built from off-the-shelf components assembled into a suitable electrical enclosure, with the necessary interconnecting wiring and mechanical supporting structures. Custom switchgear and controlgear assemblies are covered by IEC 61439-1 used with IEC 61439-2. Switchgear and controlgear assemblies are explicitly permitted for integration as part of the electrical equipment of machines under IEC 60204-1.

The electrical equipment covered by the standard includes the switchgear and controlgear of the machine. Switchgear includes the power switching components, e.g., the main disconnecting device, and breakers protecting the supply conductors and the branch circuits in the machine. Controlgear includes all of the control system components downstream of the switchgear, out to the final point of control, but not including the machine actuators.

The scope restricts the mains supply frequency to an upper limit of 200 Hz. This acts to exclude machinery built for installation on aircraft or shipboard where the supply frequency is typically 400 Hz.

Specialized machines have additional requirements found in other parts of IEC 60204, including machines that:

- are intended for use in open air (i.e. outside buildings or other protective structures);
- use, process, or produce potentially explosive material (for example paint or sawdust);
- are intended for use in potentially explosive and/or flammable atmospheres;
- have special risks when producing or using certain materials;
- are intended for use in mines;
- are sewing machines, units, and systems (which are covered by IEC 60204-31);
- are hoisting machines (which are covered by IEC 60204-32);
- are semiconductor fabrication equipment (which are covered by IEC 60204-33).

=== Exclusions ===
Specifically excluded from the scope of IEC 60204-1 are machines that are portable by hand when working, and machines "where electrical energy is directly used as a working tool."

The complete scope of the standard can be viewed by visiting the IEC catalog page for the standard and clicking on the "Preview" button to obtain the Table of Contents, Scope, and Normative References sections of the standard.

== Parts ==
IEC 60204-11, Safety of machinery - Electrical equipment of machines - Part 11: Requirements for equipment for voltages above 1 000 V AC or 1 500 V DC and not exceeding 36 kV

IEC 60204-31, Safety of machinery - Electrical equipment of machines - Part 31: Particular safety and EMC requirements for sewing machines, units and systems

IEC 60204-32, Safety of machinery - Electrical equipment of machines - Part 32: Requirements for hoisting machines

IEC 60204-33, Safety of machinery - Electrical equipment of machines - Part 33: Requirements for semiconductor fabrication equipment

IEC/TS 60204–34, Safety of machinery - Electrical equipment of machines - Part 34: Requirements for machine tools
