= IEC 62682 =

IEC 62682 is a technical standard titled Management of Alarms Systems for the Process Industries.

== Scope ==
The standard specifies principles and processes for the management of alarm systems based on distribute control systems and computer-based Human-Machine Interface (HMI) technology for the process industries. It covers alarms from all systems presented to the operator, which can include basic process control systems, annunciator panels, safety instrumented systems, fire and gas systems, and emergency response systems.

The practices are applicable to continuous, batch, and discrete processes. The process industry sector includes many types of manufacturing processes, such as refineries, petrochemical, chemical, pharmaceutical, pulp and paper, and power.

== Standard ==
Ineffective alarm systems have often been cited as contributing factors in the investigation reports following major process incidents. The standard is intended to provide a methodology that will result in the improved safety of the process industries.

IEC 62682 addresses all lifecycle phases (development, design, installation, and operation) for alarm management in the process industries. The standard defines the terminology and work processes recommended to effectively maintain an alarm system throughout the lifecycle.

The standard was written as an extension of the existing ISA 18.2-2009 standard, which utilized numerous industry alarm management guidance documents in its development such as EEMUA 191.

== See also ==
- Butterfleye
- Freeze alarm
