= IEC 62455 =

International standard

IEC 62455 (also known as the 18Crypt system) is an International Electrotechnical Commission terminal specification standard, prepared by the IEC 100 (Audio, video and multimedia systems and equipment) Technical Committee (TC), for a service purchase and protection system for digital broadcasts. Its full title is Internet protocol (IP) and transport stream (TS) based service access. This 18Crypt technology aimed to compete the Open Security Framework (OSF) has never been successful in the market where less than 10 000 deployed devices were using it. On the opposite, the OSF aimed as an open approach enabling wider competition has been widely deployed in millions of devices and re-used in many standards like in the USA (MediaFlo, ATSC-MH) or in China.

== Scope ==
The specification includes service purchase and protection functions, and applies to:

- IPDC over DVB-H systems
- DVB T/C/S systems
- MPEG2 TS-based IP systems
- Non-MPEG2 TS-based IP systems

== Editions ==
Version 1 of the standard was published in June 2007. Version 2 is expected in January 2011.

== See also ==
- Digital Video Broadcasting
- DRM
