= ISO 15118 =

Standard for vehicle-to-grid communications

- Road vehicles — Vehicle to grid communication interface
- Status: Published
- Year started: 2010
- First published: 2014
- Latest version: Edition 2; 2019
- Organization: International Standards Organisation
- Committee: ISO/TC22/SC31 Data Communication

ISO 15118 Road vehicles -- Vehicle to grid communication interface is an international standard defining a vehicle to grid (V2G) communication interface for bi-directional charging/discharging of electric vehicles (EVs). The standard provides multiple use cases like secure communication, smart charging and the Plug & Charge feature used by some electric vehicle networks.

== Overview ==
ISO 15118 is one of the International Electrotechnical Commission's (IEC) group of standards for electric road vehicles and electric industrial trucks, and is the responsibility of Joint Working Group 1 (JWG1 V2G) of IEC Technical Committee 69 (TC69) together with subcommittee 31 (SC31) of the International Organization for Standardization's (ISO) Technical Committee 22 (TC22) on road vehicles.

ISO and IEC began working together on the standard in 2010, and a Plug & Charge section was released in 2014. No automakers had a productive implementation of the standard by 2018.

== Plug & Charge ==
Plug and Charge logo (2022)

The Plug & Charge feature envisioned by ISO 15118 enables an electric vehicle to automatically identify and authorize itself to a compatible charging station. This makes it convenient for the driver, to receive energy for recharging the vehicle's battery. The only action required by the driver is to plug the charging cable into the EV and/or charging station, because the car and the station identify each other by exchanging public key certificates to facilitate payment. An open test system accessible through the internet was launched in November 2021. The proposed standard can be used for both wired (AC and DC charging) and wireless charging for electric vehicles.

Some 2021 model year EVs support the Plug & Charge standard, including the Audi e-tron GT quattro, Audi RS e-tron GT, Porsche Taycan, Mercedes-Benz EQS, Lucid Air, and Ford Mustang Mach-E. Model year 2024 EVs include most Audi models, BMW i4, BMW i5, BMW i7, BMW iX, Hyundai Ioniq 5 and Hyundai Ioniq 6.

Other manufacturers such as Volkswagen updated their ID family vehicles (such as the ID.4 and the ID.5) to support Plug & Charge. Some cars need hardware updates.

All Tesla vehicles since 2012 (before the release of ISO 15118-2 in 2014) have a proprietary version of Plug & Charge. Other proprietary solutions exist, such as those developed by Paua.

Besides Tesla, alternatives to Plug & Charge exist including "Autocharge", which is based on DIN Spec 70121 (Combined Charging System - CCS) using the car's fixed MAC address. For the end-user, the functionality is similar but tied to the specific operator and their charging rates. Autocharge has been used for many years i.e. at the charging stations of Fastned and lately of Voltrelli. In the market, Autocharge is considered a less secure mechanism than Plug & Charge because of the missing certificate chain. Cars from the Volkswagen Group even have had a software update to 'break' this functionality. While Autocharge worked flawlessly at the launch of the ID.3 model, Volkswagen switched to variable MAC addresses and therefore these cars can no longer be used with Autocharge. Some say this is for commercial reasons because the Volkswagen Group heavily invested in Plug & Charge. If Autocharge would become a big success then the need for the development of Plug & Charge would be minimized.

== Secure communications and public key infrastructure ==
ISO 15118 communication between an electric vehicle (EV) and the electric vehicle supply equipment (EVSE) can be made secure with a connection using Transport Layer Security (TLS). This is mandatory for Plug & Charge applications. The standard describes how "V2G-PKI" (Vehicle-to-grid - Public Key Infrastructure) needs to be set up to support this. The company Hubject provided the first working V2G-PKI in 2018 and the related ecosystem for the European Union and the United States. Several other companies were working on V2G-PKI solutions among which CharIn and Gireve. Nevertheless, charge station operators and automakers can also handle the certificates if they are based on the ISO 15118 standard.

As of 2019 and 2020, several Public Key Infrastructure issues remained unsolved for using the standard as proposed.

== Standard documents ==
ISO 15118 consists of the following parts, detailed in separate standard documents:

- ISO 15118-1: General information and use-case definition
- ISO 15118-2: Network and application protocol requirements
- ISO 15118-3: Physical and data link layer requirements
- ISO 15118-4: Network and application protocol conformance test
- ISO 15118-5: Physical and data link layer conformance test
- ISO 15118-6: General information and use-case definition for wireless communication (not developed, merged with 2nd edition of ISO 15118-1)
- ISO 15118-7: Network and application protocol requirements for wireless communication (not developed, merged with ISO 15118–20)
- ISO 15118-8: Physical layer and data link layer requirements for wireless communication
- ISO 15118-9: Physical and data link layer conformance test for wireless communication
- ISO 15118-10: Physical layer and data link layer requirements for single-pair Ethernet
- ISO 15118-11: Physical layer and data link layer requirements for single-pair conformance test plan (under development)
- ISO 15118-12: Requirements of message exchange for value-added service-based battery information between EVCC and SECC (under development)
- ISO 15118-20: 2nd generation network layer and application layer requirements (being amended)
- ISO 15118-21: Common 2nd generation network layer and application layer requirements conformance test plan

== Heavy duty vehicles ==
ISO 15118 is also used as communication protocol for charging of heavy duty vehicles such as:

- Harbor Automated Guided Vehicles
- Buses and lorries

When using the ISO 15118 in a commercial operation the use of WLAN (ISO 15118-8) must be considered carefully since there is no way to guarantee operation uptime when using wireless communication based on WLAN. For these situations the same protocol as for passenger car charging can be used (ISO 15118-2).

== See also ==
- Combined Charging System (CCS)
- IEC 61850 - Communication protocols for intelligent electronic devices at electrical substations
- IEC 61851 - Standard for electric vehicle conductive charging systems
- IEC 63110 - Protocol for the management of electric vehicles charging and discharging infrastructure
- OCPP - An application protocol for communication between Electric vehicle (EV) charging stations and a central management system, also known as a charging station network
