= Open Charge Point Protocol =

Protocol for managing EV charging stations

- Communication protocol
- Abbreviation: OCPP
- Purpose: Communication between electric vehicle charging stations and central management systems
- Developer: Open Charge Alliance
- Introduction: 2010; 16 years ago
- OSI layer: Application
- Website: openchargealliance.org/protocols/open-charge-point-protocol

The Open Charge Point Protocol (OCPP) is an application protocol for communication between charging stations for electric vehicles (EVs) and a central management system, also known as a charging station network. It is comparable to communication between cell phones and cell phone networks. The original version of OCPP was developed by LogicaCMG and Enexis led by Michel Bayings with Franc Buve, Patrick Rademakers and Joury de Reuver. The first version was released in 2009. The OCPP enables smooth communication between chargers and management platforms, allowing centralized monitoring and load control.

OCPP is used by a large number of vendors of EV charging stations and central management systems globally. The latest version, OCPP 2.1, was released in January 2025. This version includes distributed energy resources control and vehicle-to-grid capabilities, and is backwards compatible with OCPP 2.0.1.

In late 2024, OCPP 2.0.1 Edition 3 was accepted by the International Electrotechnical Commission (IEC) as IEC standard 63584. OCPP is developed and maintained by the Open Charge Alliance (OCA), a non-profit foundation under Dutch law, headquartered in Arnhem, the Netherlands. It is an open standard, and can be downloaded for free. To contribute to OCPP's development, one must become a member of the Open Charge Alliance.

== History ==
OCPP was designed in 2009 at the request of the ElaadNL foundation, a research consortium of Dutch electrical distribution system operators (DSOs). The technical design and specifications were developed by LogicaCMG, Elaad and Enexis by a team including Michel Bayings, Joury de Reuver, Franc Buve, and Patrick Rademakers. The goal was to create a protocol that enables communication between EV charging stations and central management systems from different vendors.

The first version of OCPP was published by ElaadNL in 2010 as an open standard. This was followed by OCPP 1.5 in 2012, and then OCPP 1.6 in 2015, which introduced new features such as JSON, SOAP, and Smart Charging.

With growing adoption, ElaadNL transferred the stewardship of OCPP to the Open Charge Alliance (OCA), which it co-founded with ESB Group (Ireland) and Greenlots (USA). In 2018, OCPP 2.0 was released. Due to its comprehensive overhaul, it is not backward compatible with earlier versions. In 2019, OCA launched an OCPP 1.6 certification program, followed by OCPP 2.0.1 certification in 2023.

== Objectives ==
The main objective of OCPP is to provide a standard communication interface used by all charging stations to avoid vendor lock-in. This enhances interoperability and flexibility, enabling charging station owners to switch networks or hardware providers without being locked into proprietary systems.

OCPP facilitates the creation of large, diverse charging networks using a uniform protocol. It also defines end-to-end security architecture and provides implementation guidelines to protect against cyber threats such as server hijacking, eavesdropping, and device impersonation.

== Certification ==
The OCA operates a certification program to ensure compliance with the OCPP specification. Certification is available for OCPP 1.6 (since 2019) and OCPP 2.0.1 (since 2023). Certification labs appointed by OCA conduct the testing.

== Adoption ==
=== United States ===
In the U.S., OCPP adoption has increased since the Federal Highway Administration required its use (or an equivalent protocol) under the National Electric Vehicle Infrastructure (NEVI) Program. The states of New York and California require OCPP compliance for charging infrastructure funding.

The United States Department of Energy has supported interoperability efforts since 2013 through the EV-Smart Grid Interoperability Center at Argonne National Laboratory.

=== Asia ===
In South Korea, OCPP is widely used for charging station management. Its popularity is driven by the requirement for OCPP certification in order to receive public funding.

=== Europe ===
OCPP originated in Europe, and much of the protocol's development community is based there. Several cities and regions mandate OCPP use for communication between recharging points and charge point operators (CPOs). In 2020, the European Commission's Sustainable Transport Forum issued recommendations promoting OCPP compliance in tenders and funding programs. In the UK, since July 2019, new charging stations must meet smart charging requirements to qualify for funding under the Electric Vehicle Homecharge Scheme. While OCPP is not explicitly mandated, compliance with OCPP 1.6 or equivalent is necessary to meet these smart criteria.

=== Australia ===
South Australia only permits the installation of new EV chargers that are OCPP-compliant. In other states and territories, OCPP is not required.

== See also ==
- IEC 61850 - communication protocols for intelligent electronic devices at electrical substations
- IEC 61851 - standard for electric vehicle conductive charging systems
- IEC 63110 - protocol for the management of electric vehicles charging and discharging infrastructure
- ISO 15118 - standard for vehicle-to-grid communication interface
- Payment gateway
