= IEC 60601 =

IEEE standard for medical equipment

IEC 60601 is a series of technical standards for the safety and essential performance of medical electrical equipment, published by the International Electrotechnical Commission. First published in 1977 and regularly updated and restructured, as of 2011 it consists of a general standard, about 10 collateral standards, and about 80 particular standards.

== General standard ==
The general standard IEC 60601-1 – Medical electrical equipment – Part 1: General requirements for basic safety and essential performance – gives general requirements of the series of standards. 60601 is a widely accepted benchmark for medical electrical equipment and compliance with IEC60601-1 has become a requirement for the commercialisation of electrical medical equipment in many countries. Many companies view compliance with IEC 60601-1 as a requirement for most markets. This standard does not assure effectiveness of a medical device. In the US, evidence of effectiveness is required by the FDA and confirmed through either a Premarket Approval (PMA) or similarity to a predicate device via a 510(k) Premarket Notification.

National deviations of this series of standards exist which include country specific requirements; see e.g. UL or AAMI for US specifics.

The European EN and Canadian CSA versions of the standard are identical to the IEC standard.

== Revisions ==
In 2005, the third edition of IEC 60601-1 was published. It was the result of a comprehensive review of the second edition (dating from 1988). Some key changes are: the outline and the numbering scheme of the clauses and subclauses were changed, risk management was made much more relevant and the concept of essential performance was added. Currently (2012), the applicability of the second and third edition is somewhat overlapping depending on the products under consideration and the country/area of application. IEC 60601-1-11 (2010) must now be incorporated into the design and verification of a wide range of home use and point of care medical devices along with other applicable standards in the IEC 60601 3rd edition series. IEC 60601-1 merged to medical device directive 93/42/EEC which covers all IEC standard of electromedical & electrical safety so it is clear that EC cover all Previous IEC standard to medical device directive 93/42/EEC

The mandatory date for implementation of the EN European version of the standard is June 1, 2012. The US FDA requires the use of the standard on June 30, 2013, while Health Canada recently extended the required date from June 2012 to April 2013. The North American agencies will only require these standards for new device submissions, while the EU will take the more severe approach of requiring all applicable devices being placed on the market to consider the home healthcare standard.

The second amendment to IEC 60601-1:2005 was published on August 20, 2020. The mandatory date for implementation of IEC 60601-1:2005/AMD2:2020 for new submittals to the US FDA is December 17, 2023. As of September 2025, the official journal of the European Union has not announced an official transition period for the applicability of Amendment 2, however under council directive 2017/745 (Medical Device Regulation), manufacturers must consider the current state of the art to maintain compliance.

== Collateral and particular standards ==
Requirements of 60601-1 may be overridden or bypassed by specific language in the standards for a particular product. Collateral standards (numbered 60601-1-X) define the requirements for certain aspects of safety and performance, e.g. Electromagnetic Disturbances (IEC 60601-1-2) or Protection for diagnostic use of X-rays (IEC 60601-1-3). Particular standards (numbered 60601-2-X) define the requirements for specific products or specific measurements built into products, e.g. MR scanners (IEC 60601-2-33) or Electroencephalograms (IEC 60601-2-26). Collaterals and Particulars may have their own revisions which are different from the General Standard.

A list of the collateral and particular standards currently in force follows: (last updated 15 September 2016)

- IEC 60601-1-2 Medical electrical equipment - Part 1-2: General requirements for basic safety and essential performance - Collateral Standard: Electromagnetic disturbances - Requirements and tests
- IEC 60601-1-3 Medical electrical equipment - Part 1-3: General requirements for basic safety and essential performance - Collateral Standard: Radiation protection in diagnostic X-ray equipment
- IEC 60601-1-6 Medical electrical equipment - Part 1-6: General requirements for basic safety and essential performance - Collateral standard: Usability
- IEC 60601-1-8 Medical electrical equipment - Part 1-8: General requirements for basic safety and essential performance - Collateral Standard: General requirements, tests and guidance for alarm systems in medical electrical equipment and medical electrical systems
- IEC 60601-1-9 Medical electrical equipment - Part 1-9: General requirements for basic safety and essential performance - Collateral Standard: Requirements for environmentally conscious design
- IEC 60601-1-10 Medical electrical equipment - Part 1-10: General requirements for basic safety and essential performance - Collateral Standard: Requirements for the development of physiologic closed-loop controllers
- IEC 60601-1-11 Medical electrical equipment - Part 1-11: General requirements for basic safety and essential performance - Collateral Standard: Requirements for medical electrical equipment and medical electrical systems used in the home healthcare environment
- IEC 60601-1-12 Medical electrical equipment - Part 1-12: General requirements for basic safety and essential performance - Collateral Standard: Requirements for medical electrical equipment and medical electrical systems intended for use in the emergency medical services environment
- IEC 60601-2-1 Medical electrical equipment - Part 2-1: Particular requirements for the basic safety and essential performance of electron accelerators in the range 1 MeV to 50 MeV
- IEC 60601-2-2 Medical electrical equipment - Part 2-2: Particular requirements for the basic safety and essential performance of high frequency surgical equipment and high frequency surgical accessories
- IEC 60601-2-3 Medical electrical equipment - Part 2-3: Particular requirements for the basic safety and essential performance of short-wave therapy equipment
- IEC 60601-2-4 Medical electrical equipment - Part 2-4: Particular requirements for the basic safety and essential performance of cardiac defibrillators
- IEC 60601-2-5 Medical electrical equipment – Part 2-5: Particular requirements for the basic safety and essential performance of ultrasonic physiotherapy equipment
- IEC 60601-2-6 Medical electrical equipment - Part 2-6: Particular requirements for the basic safety and essential performance of microwave therapy equipment
- IEC 60601-2-8 Medical electrical equipment - Part 2-8: Particular requirements for basic safety and essential performance of therapeutic X-ray equipment operating in the range 10 kV to 1 MV
- IEC 60601-2-10 Medical electrical equipment - Part 2-10: Particular requirements for the basic safety and essential performance of nerve and muscle stimulators
- IEC 60601-2-11 Medical electrical equipment - Part 2-11: Particular requirements for the basic safety and essential performance of gamma beam therapy equipment
- IEC 60601-2-12 Medical electrical equipment - Part 2-12: Particular requirements for the basic safety and essential performance of critical care ventilators
- IEC 60601-2-13 Medical electrical equipment - Part 2-13: Particular requirements for basic safety and essential performance of anaesthetic systems
- IEC 60601-2-16 Medical electrical equipment - Part 2-16: Particular requirements for basic safety and essential performance of haemodialysis, haemodiafiltration and haemofiltration equipment
- IEC 60601-2-17 Medical electrical equipment - Part 2-17: Particular requirements for the basic safety and essential performance of automatically controlled brachytherapy afterloading equipment
- IEC 60601-2-18 Medical electrical equipment - Part 2-18: Particular requirements for the basic safety and essential performance of endoscopic equipment
- IEC 60601-2-19 Medical electrical equipment - Part 2-19: Particular requirements for the basic safety and essential performance of infant incubators
- IEC 60601-2-20 Medical electrical equipment - Part 2-20: Particular requirements for the basic safety and essential performance of infant transport incubators
- IEC 60601-2-21 Medical electrical equipment - Part 2-21: Particular requirements for the basic safety and essential performance of infant radiant warmers
- IEC 60601-2-22 Medical electrical equipment - Part 2-22: Particular requirements for basic safety and essential performance of surgical, cosmetic, therapeutic and diagnostic laser equipment
- IEC 60601-2-23 Medical electrical equipment - Part 2-23: Particular requirements for the basic safety and essential performance of transcutaneous partial pressure monitoring equipment
- IEC 60601-2-24 Medical electrical equipment - Part 2-24: Particular requirements for the basic safety and essential performance of infusion pumps and controllers
- IEC 60601-2-25 Medical electrical equipment - Part 2-25: Particular requirements for the basic safety and essential performance of electrocardiographs
- IEC 60601-2-26 Medical electrical equipment - Part 2-26: Particular requirements for the basic safety and essential performance of electroencephalographs
- IEC 60601-2-27 Medical electrical equipment - Part 2-27: Particular requirements for the basic safety and essential performance of electrocardiographic monitoring equipment
- IEC 60601-2-28 Medical electrical equipment - Part 2-28: Particular requirements for the basic safety and essential performance of X-ray tube assemblies for medical diagnosis
- IEC 60601-2-29 Medical electrical equipment - Part 2-29: Particular requirements for the basic safety and essential performance of radiotherapy simulators
- IEC 60601-2-30 Medical electrical equipment - Part 2-30: Particular requirements for the basic safety and essential performance of automated non-invasive sphygmomanometers.
- IEC 60601-2-31 Medical electrical equipment - Part 2-31: Particular requirements for the basic safety and essential performance of external cardiac pacemakers with internal power source
- IEC 60601-2-33 Medical electrical equipment - Part 2-33: Particular requirements for the basic safety and essential performance of magnetic resonance equipment for medical diagnosis
- IEC 60601-2-34 Medical electrical equipment - Part 2-34: Particular requirements for the basic safety and essential performance of invasive blood pressure monitoring equipment
- IEC 60601-2-36 Medical electrical equipment - Part 2-36: Particular requirements for the basic safety and essential performance of equipment for extracorporeally induced lithotripsy
- IEC 60601-2-37 Medical electrical equipment - Part 2-37: Particular requirements for the basic safety and essential performance of ultrasonic medical diagnostic and monitoring equipment
- IEC 60601-2-39 Medical electrical equipment - Part 2-39: Particular requirements for basic safety and essential performance of peritoneal dialysis equipment
- IEC 60601-2-40 Medical electrical equipment - Part 2-40: Particular requirements for the basic safety and essential performance of electromyographs and evoked response equipment
- IEC 60601-2-41 Medical electrical equipment - Part 2-41: Particular requirements for the basic safety and essential performance of surgical luminaires and luminaires for diagnosis
- IEC 60601-2-43 Medical electrical equipment - Part 2-43: Particular requirements for the basic safety and essential performance of X-ray equipment for interventional procedures
- IEC 60601-2-44 Medical electrical equipment - Part 2-44: Particular requirements for the basic safety and essential performance of X-ray equipment for computed tomography
- IEC 60601-2-45 Medical electrical equipment - Part 2-45: Particular requirements for basic safety and essential performance of mammographic X-ray equipment and mammomagraphic stereotactic devices
- IEC 60601-2-46 Medical electrical equipment - Part 2-46: Particular requirements for the basic safety and essential performance of operating tables
- IEC 60601-2-47 Medical electrical equipment - Part 2-47: Particular requirements for the basic safety and essential performance of ambulatory electrocardiographic systems
- IEC 60601-2-49 Medical electrical equipment - Part 2-49: Particular requirements for the basic safety and essential performance of multifunction patient monitoring equipment
- IEC 60601-2-50 Medical electrical equipment - Part 2-50: Particular requirements for the basic safety and essential performance of infant phototherapy equipment
- IEC 60601-2-52 Medical electrical equipment - Part 2-52: Particular requirements for the basic safety and essential performance of medical beds
- IEC 60601-2-54 Medical electrical equipment - Part 2-54: Particular requirements for the basic safety and essential performance of X-ray equipment for radiography and radioscopy
- IEC 60601-2-57 Medical electrical equipment - Part 2-57: Particular requirements for the basic safety and essential performance of non-laser light source equipment intended for therapeutic, diagnostic, monitoring and cosmetic/aesthetic use
- IEC 60601-2-62 Medical electrical equipment - Part 2-62: Particular requirements for the basic safety and essential performance of high intensity therapeutic ultrasound (HITU) equipment
- IEC 60601-2-63 Medical electrical equipment - Part 2-63: Particular requirements for the basic safety and essential performance of dental extra-oral X-ray equipment
- IEC 60601-2-64 Medical electrical equipment - Part 2-64: Particular requirements for the basic safety and essential performance of light ion beam medical electrical equipment
- IEC 60601-2-65 Medical electrical equipment - Part 2-65: Particular requirements for the basic safety and essential performance of dental intra-oral X-ray equipment
- IEC 60601-2-66 Medical electrical equipment - Part 2-66: Particular requirements for the basic safety and essential performance of hearing instruments and hearing instrument systems
- IEC 60601-2-68 Electrical medical equipment - Part 2-68: Particular requirements for the basic safety and essential performance of X-ray-based image-guided radiotherapy equipment for use with electron accelerators, light ion beam therapy equipment and radionuclide beam therapy equipment
- IEC 60601-2-75 Medical electrical equipment - Part 2-75: Particular requirements for the basic safety and essential performance of photodynamic therapy and photodynamic diagnosis equipment
- IEC 60601-2-76:2018 Medical electrical equipment - Part 2-76: Particular requirements for the basic safety and essential performance of low energy ionized gas haemostasis equipment
- IEC 60601-2-83:2019 Medical electrical equipment - Part 2-83: Particular requirements for the basic safety and essential performance of home light therapy equipment
- IEC 60601-2-84:2018 Medical electrical equipment - Part 2-84: Particular requirements for the basic safety and essential performance of emergency and transport ventilators

For example, IEC 60601-1-9 for Environmentally Conscious Design of Medical Electrical Equipment published July 2007 is a collateral standard to IEC 60601-1 and has been developed drawing on extensive practical experience at Philips Medical Systems and Siemens Healthineers. The Part 9 standard asks manufacturers of medical devices to consider the environmental impacts of their devices throughout the product's entire life cycle and to minimize these where possible. The standard also requires that the manufacturer provide information to the user on how to use the product in the most environmentally sensitive way. The USA, Canada, Japan, Australia and New Zealand have not yet set transition dates for their national versions of this latest edition 60601-1, but the national versions published to date do contain the requirement to also conform with IEC 60601-1-9. However, the European version (EN 60601-1:2006) requires compliance with the new IEC 60601-1-9 collateral standard by September 2009.

According to the recent publication of the US national version of the collateral standard for products intended for home use, ANSI/AAMI HA60601-1-11, the application of the standard does not apply to the nursing home environment. In the United States, nursing facilities are considered to be environments providing professional healthcare. The American version of this collateral standard also places greater emphasis on a requirement that states that “inspection of the usability engineering file reinforce that the usability engineering process is necessary for validation of the instructions for use.” Devices typically mandated to use the new standard include oxygen concentrators, body-worn nerve and muscle stimulators, beds, sleep apnea monitors, and associated battery chargers prescribed for use at home. Although In Vitro Diagnostic devices such as blood glucose meters are being used by patients at home, the standard does not apply, as these devices remain under the jurisdiction of the more lenient IEC 61010 series.

== Critics ==
The 60601 certification process has been criticized for its complexity, cost, and the business risk it raises. This has been more particularly a concern during the transition to the third edition due to the indefinite adoption schedule of the new revision.

== See also ==
- List of IEC standards
