= IEC 63110 =

International standard for electric vehicle infrastructure

IEC 63110 is an international standard defining a protocol for the management of electric vehicles charging and discharging infrastructures, which is currently under development. IEC 63110 is one of the International Electrotechnical Commission's group of standards for electric road vehicles and electric industrial trucks, and is the responsibility of Joint Working Group 11 (JWG11) of IEC Technical Committee 69 (TC69).

Development of 63110-1 has finished, and both 63110-2 and 63110-3 have run out of time and were cancelled.

== Standard documents ==
IEC 63110 consists of the following parts, detailed in separate IEC 63110 standard documents:

- IEC 63110-1: Basic definitions, use cases and architectures
- IEC 63110-2: Technical protocol specifications and requirements
- IEC 63110-3: Requirements for conformance tests

== See also ==
- ISO 15118 – Standard defining a vehicle to grid (V2G) communication interface for bi-directional charging/discharging of electric vehicles
- IEC 61850 – Communication protocols for intelligent electronic devices at electrical substations
- IEC 61851 – Standard for electric vehicle conductive charging systems
- OCPP – An application protocol for communication between Electric vehicle (EV) charging stations (EVSE) and a central management system, also known as a charging station network
