= PLCopen =

Industrial automation organization

PLCopen is an independent organisation providing efficiency in industrial automation based on the needs of users. PLCopen members have concentrated on technical specifications around IEC 61131-3, creating specifications and implementations in order to reduce cost in industrial engineering. The outcome for example is standardized libraries for different application fields, harmonized language conformity levels and engineering interfaces for exchange. Experts of the PLCopen members are organized in technical committees and together with end users define such open standards.

PLCopen was founded in 1992 just after the world wide programming standard IEC 61131-3 was published. The controls market at that time was a very heterogeneous market with different types of programming methods for many different PLCs. The IEC 61131-3 is a standard defining the programming languages for PLCs, embedded controls, and industrial PCs, harmonizing applications independent from specific dialects, but still based on known methods such as the textual programming languages Instruction List, and Structured Text, the graphical programming languages Function Block Diagram and Ladder Diagram (a.k.a. Ladder logic), and the structuring tool Sequential Function Chart.

Today, IEC 61131-3 is a highly accepted programming standard and many industrial software and hardware companies offer products based on this standard, which in the end are used in many different machinery and other application fields.

Current topics are:

- Motion control and
- Safety functionality
- XML data exchange format standardizing the base data of IEC projects in software systems, as used for instance by AutomationML
- Benchmarking projects in order to have a good sophisticated benchmark standard.
- And in the field of communication PLCopen has developed together with OPC Foundation the mapping of the IEC 61131-3 software model to the OPC Unified Architecture information model.
