= Sama College of Mashhad =

Coordinates: 36.3713560°N 59.4874690°E

- آموزشکده فنی و حرفه ای سما مشهد
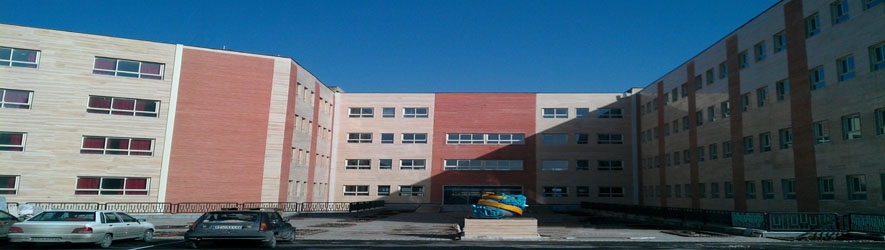
- Sama Technical and Vocational Training College of Mashhad
- Motto: سمائی بود هرکه ساعی بود
- Motto in English: whoever is diligent is Samaei
- Type: Public
- Established: 2003
- Chancellor: Seyed Morteza Alavi
- Vice-Chancellor: Majid Salari
- Students: Close to 3000
- Location: Mashhad, Iran
- Campus: Urban
- Colours: Blue
- Website: http://scm.mshdiau.ac.ir

Sama Technical and Vocational Training College of Mashhad is a college affiliated with Islamic Azad University, Mashhad Branch. It was established in 2003 and provides associate degree programs and technical courses in accounting and computer science.

== Overview ==
Sama Technical and Vocational Training College of Mashhad has the largest campus among the university's branches in Iran, with about 16300 square meters of infrastructure, including labs and studios.

Currently, this unit has 32 full-time faculty members, 180 invited lecturers, and 3200 students in 13 associate degree programs.

The college holds workshops with equipment and laboratories for the electrical programs (such as general electronic workshops, electric machine laboratories, and industrial power circuits), in addition to industrial PLC, hydraulics, pneumatics and winding laboratories for auto mechanic programs, as well as studios and workshops for surveying and architecture students.

Sama Technical and Vocational training College of Mashhad is equipped with several computer sites and a library which contains 14000 reference works. Students can participate in scientific, cultural, sport, and research activities.

== Sama Deputy ==
Mashhad Sama Deputy of Mashhad, affiliated with Islamic Azad University, Mashhad Branch, was founded in 1992 by establishing two all-girls high schools and enrolling 165 students. Now, it runs 12 single-gender schools with more than 2500 students combined, in addition to four foreign language institutes with 2250 language learners as well as Sama Technical and Vocational Training College of Mashhad.
