= IEC 61131 =

Standard for programmable controllers

IEC 61131 is an IEC standard for programmable controllers. It was first published in 1993; the current (4th) edition dates from 2025. It was known as IEC 1131 before the change in numbering system by IEC. The parts of the IEC 61131 standard are prepared and maintained by working group 7, programmable control systems, of subcommittee SC 65B of Technical Committee TC65 of the IEC.

== Sections of IEC 61131 ==
Standard IEC 61131 is divided into several parts:

- Part 1: General information. It is the introductory chapter; it contains definitions of terms that are used in the subsequent parts of the standard and outlines the main functional properties and characteristics of PLCs.
- Part 2: Equipment requirements and tests - establishes the requirements and associated tests for programmable controllers and their peripherals. This standard prescribes: the normal service conditions and requirements (for example, requirements related with climatic conditions, transport and storage, electrical service, etc.); functional requirements (power supply & memory, digital and analog I/Os); functional type tests and verification (requirements and tests on environmental, vibration, drop, free fall, I/O, power ports, etc.) and electromagnetic compatibility (EMC) requirements and tests that programmable controllers must implement. This standard can serve as a basis in the evaluation of safety programmable controllers to IEC 61508.
- Part 3: Programming languages
- Part 4: User guidelines
- Part 5: Communications
- Part 6: Functional safety
- Part 7: Fuzzy control programming
- Part 8: Guidelines for the application and implementation of programming languages
- Part 9: Single-drop digital communication interface for small sensors and actuators (SDCI, marketed as IO-Link)
- Part 10: PLC open XML exchange format for the export and import of IEC 61131-3 projects

== Related standards ==
IEC 61499 Function Block

PLCopen has developed several standards and working groups.

- TC1 - Standards
- TC2 - Functions
- TC3 - Certification
- TC4 - Communications
- TC5 - Safe Software
- TC6 - XML
- Motion Control Library
- Presentation on IEC 61131-3

== Sources ==
- R.W. Lewis, Modelling control systems using IEC 61499
- R.W. Lewis, Programming industrial control systems using IEC 1131-3
- K.H. John & M. Tiegelkamp, IEC 61131-3: Programming Industrial Automation Systems
