= PLC technician =

Profession

PLC technicians design, program, repair, and maintain programmable logic controller (PLC) systems used within manufacturing and service industries ranging from industrial packaging to commercial car washes and traffic lights.

== Scope of work ==
PLC technicians are knowledgeable in overall plant systems and the interactions of processes. They install and service a variety of systems, including safety and security, energy delivery (hydraulic, pneumatic and electrical), communication, and process control systems. They also install and service measuring and indicating instruments to monitor process control variables associated with PLCs, and monitor the operation of PLC equipment. PLC technicians work with final control devices such as valves, actuators and positioners to manipulate the process medium. They install and terminate electrical, pneumatic, and fluid connections. They also work on network and signal transmission systems such as fibre optic and wireless.

Along with the calibration, repair, adjustment, and replacement of components, PLC technicians inspect and test the operation of instruments and systems to diagnose faults and verify repairs. They establish and optimize process control strategies, and configure related systems such as Distributed Control Systems (DCSs), Supervisory Control & Data Acquisition (SCADA), and Human Machine Interfaces (HMIs). PLC technicians maintain backups, documentation, and software revisions as part of maintaining these computer-based control systems. Scheduled maintenance and the commissioning of systems are also important aspects of the work. PLC technicians consult technical documentation, drawings, schematics, and manuals. They may assist engineering in plant design, modification and hazard analysis, and work with plant operators to optimize plant controls.

PLC technicians use hand, power, and electronic tools, test equipment, and material handling equipment. They work on a variety of systems, including primary control elements, transmitters, analyzers, sensors, detectors, signal conditioners, recorders, controllers, and final control elements (actuators, valve positioners, etc.). These instruments measure and control variables such as pressure, flow, temperature, level, motion, force, and chemical composition. PLC systems designed and maintained by PLC technicians range from high-speed robotic assembly to conveyors, to batch mixers, to DCS and SCADA systems. PLC systems are often found within industrial and manufacturing plants, such as food processing facilities. Alternate job titles include PLC engineer, Automation Technician, Field Technician, or Controls Technician.

== Education, training and skills ==
PLC technician educational courses and programs integrate PLC programming with mechanics, electronics and process controls, They also commonly include coursework in hydraulics, pneumatics, robotics, DCS, SCADA, electrical circuits, electrical machinery and human-machine interfaces. Typical courses include math, communications, circuits, digital devices, and electrical controls. Other courses include robotics, automation, electrical motor controls, programmable logic controllers, and computer-aided design. When performing their duties, PLC technicians must comply with federal, jurisdictional, industrial, and site-specific standards, codes, and regulations. They must ensure that all processes operate and are maintained within these set standards, codes, and regulations. Keeping up-to-date with advances in technology in the industry is important. Key attributes for PLC Technicians are critical thinking skills, manual dexterity, mechanical aptitude, attention to detail, strong problem-solving skills, communication skills, and mathematical and scientific aptitude.

Employers generally prefer applicants who have completed a PLC technician certificate or related associate degree. These programs can be completed at Colleges and Universities in either an in-class or online format. Some Colleges, such as George Brown College, offer an online PLC Technician program that uses simulation software, PLCLogix, to complete PLC lab projects and assignments. Certification by accredited schools and third-party organizations can enhance employment opportunities and keep PLC technicians current and up-to-date. In addition to colleges and universities, other organizations and companies also offer credential programs in PLCs, including equipment manufacturers such as Rockwell and professional associations, such as the Electronics Technicians Association, Robotics Industries Association and the Manufacturing Skill Standards Council.

== Career opportunities ==
PLC technicians install and repair industrial electronic equipment (including input/output networks, data highways, variable speed drives, and process control equipment) and write PLC programs for a wide variety of automated control systems, ranging from simple on–off controls to robotics. PLC technicians also find employment in the industrial engineering field where they are actively involved in the design and implementation of PLC control systems.

Career opportunities for PLC Technicians include a wide range of manufacturing and service industries such as automotive, pharmaceutical, electric power distribution, food processing, mining, and transportation. Other career prospects include areas such as machine assembly, troubleshooting, and testing, systems integration, application support, maintenance, component testing and assembly, automation programming, robot maintenance and programming, technical sales and services.

PLC technicians work mainly indoors, on the plant floor and sometimes in cramped conditions. They may be required to stand for prolonged periods of time and be exposed to high noise, fumes and heat levels. Because this is such an important job, they must pay close attention to safety and may be called out in emergencies. Constant learning may be required to keep up with new technology.

Primarily, work in this area is full-time and can be in shifts. Employers who hire PLC technicians include:

- Automation equipment wholesalers
- Industrial manufacturing companies
- Water treatment plants
- Nuclear, wind, thermal, and hydroelectric power companies
- Pharmaceutical companies
- Mining, petrochemical and natural gas companies
- Pulp and paper processing companies

== See also ==
- Industrial control system
