= IO-Link =

Communication protocol

IO-Link is a short distance, bi-directional, digital, point-to-point, wired (or wireless), industrial communications networking standard (IEC 61131-9) used for connecting digital sensors and actuators to either a type of industrial fieldbus or an industrial Ethernet. Its objective is to provide a technological platform that enables the development and use of sensors and actuators that can produce and consume enriched sets of data that in turn can be used for economically optimizing industrial automated processes and operations. The technology standard is managed by the industry association Profibus and Profinet International. The IO-Link market may surpass $34 billion by 2028.

== System overview ==
An IO-Link system consists of an IO-Link master and one or more IO-Link devices, i.e. Sensors or Actuators. The IO-Link master provides the interface to the higher-level controller (PLC) and controls the communication with the connected IO-Link devices.

An IO-Link master can have one or more IO-Link ports to which only one device can be connected at a time. This can also be a "hub" which, as a concentrator, enables the connection of classic switching sensors and actuators.

An IO-Link device can be an intelligent sensor, actuator, hub or, due to bidirectional communication, also a mechatronic component, e.g. a gripper or a power supply unit with IO-Link connection. Intelligent with regard to IO-Link means that a device has identification data e.g. a type designation and a serial number or parameter data (e.g. sensitivities, switching delays or characteristic curves) that can be read or written via the IO-Link protocol. This allows parameters to be changed by the PLC during operation, for example. Intelligent also means, however, that it can provide detailed diagnostic information. IO-Link and the data transmitted with it are often used for preventive maintenance and servicing, e.g. it is possible to set an optical sensor in such a way that it reports via IO-Link in good time if it threatens to become dirty. Cleaning no longer comes as a surprise and blocks production; it can now be put on a production break.

The parameters of the sensors and actuators are device- and technology-specific, which is why parameter information in the form of an IODD (IO Device Description) with the description language XML. The IO-Link community provides interfaces to an "IODD Finder", which can be used by engineering or master tools to present the appropriate IODD for a device.

== Connector ==
Cabling is in the form of an unshielded, three or five conductor cables, not longer than twenty meters, and a standardized four or five pin connector. The master and device pin assignment is based on the specifications in IEC 60947–5–2. For a master, two port classes are defined, port class A and port class B. Port class A uses M5, M8, or M12 connectors, with a maximum of four pins. Port class B uses only M12 connectors with 5 pins. M12 connectors are mechanically "A"-coded according to IEC 61076–2–101. Female connectors are assigned to the master and male connectors to the device.

At the master pin 1 to pin 3 provides 24V DC power with max. 200 mA for an optional power supply of the IO-Link device. Pin 4 is used as a digital input (DI) or digital output (DO) according to the IEC 61131-2 specification to allow backward compatibility to proximity sensors according to IEC60947-5-2 or other sensors or electrical switches.

The IO-Link master sends a wake-up current pulse to get the IO-Link device from the serial input-output (SIO) state into the single-drop digital communication interface (SDCI) state. In the SDCI state the IO-Link master exchanges information frames with the IO-Link device.

In a port class A the pins 2 and 5 are not specified and are left to the manufacturer to define. In a port class B the pins 2 and 5 are configured as an additional power supply.

== Protocol ==
The IO-Link communications protocol consists of communication ports, communication modes, data types, and transmission speeds. The ports are physically located on the master, and provide it a means for connecting with terminal devices and for bridging to a fieldbus or Ethernet. There are four communication modes that can be applied to a port connected to a terminal device: IO-Link, DI, DQ, and Deactivated. IO-Link mode configures the port for bi-directional communications, DI mode configures it as an input, DQ configures it as an output, and Deactivated just simply deactivates the port. There are four data types: process data, value status data, device data, and event data. The protocol can be configured to operate at transmission speeds of either 4.8 kilobaud, 38.4 kilobaud, or 230.4 kilobaud. The minimum transmission time at 230.4 kilobaud is 400 microseconds. An engineering tool is used for configuring the master to operate as the network bridge.

== IO-Link Wireless ==
IO-Link Wireless is an extension of IO-Link on the physical level. An IO-Link Wireless Master ("W-Master") behaves like a Master to the superordinate system. There are only virtual ports "down" to the IO-Link Wireless Devices ("W-Devices").

A transmission cycle consists of two phases. To transmit output data, the W master sends a Multicast-W frame (Downlink) with data for the W devices in assigned time slots. Then the W-Master goes on reception and collects in the Uplink Data from the W-Devices which transmit one after the other according to an agreed fixed scheme.

To secure the transmission Frequency Hopping and Channel-Blacklisting are used.

== IO-Link Safety ==
IO-Link Safety is an extension of IO-Link by providing an additional safety communication layer on the existing master and device layers, which thus become the "FS master" and "FS device". One also speaks of the Black Channel principle. The concept has been tested by TÜV SÜD.

IO-Link Safety has also extended the OSSD (Output Switching Signal Device) output switching elements commonly used for functional safety in a non-contact protective device like a light curtain to OSSDe. As with standard IO-Link, an FS-Device can be operated both in switching mode as OSSDe and via functionally safe IO-Link communication.

During implementation, the safety rules of IEC 61508 and/or ISO 13849 must be observed.

== Literature ==
- Joachim R. Uffelmann, Peter Wienzek, Myriam Jahn: IO-Link. The DNA of Industry 4.0. Edition 1. Vulkan-Verlag GmbH, Essen 2018, ISBN 978-3-8356-7390-8.
