= Continuous Function Chart =

A Continuous Function Chart (CFC) is a graphic editor that can be used in conjunction with the STEP 7 software package or with other tools, such as CODESYS. It is used to create the entire software structure of the CPU from ready-made blocks. When working with the editor, you place blocks on function charts, assign parameters to them, and interconnect them. Interconnecting means, for example, that values are transferred from one output to one or more inputs during communication between the blocks.

Continuous function charts are basically used for controlling continuous processes, where all the logic is executed and outputs are calculated in each PLC scan. Whereas in SFC, execution will be sequential as done is batch processes.
