= IODD =

The IODD (IO Device Description) describes sensors and actuators with an IO-Link communication interface. It contains information about the device’s identity, parameters, process data, diagnosis data, communication properties and the design of the user interface of engineering tools. The IODD comprises different data files: the main file and several optional language files are in XML-format and optional graphical files are in PNG-format (portable network graphics).

== Structure ==
The IODD structure conforms to the specifications of the standard ISO 15745 “Industrial automation systems and integration – Open systems application integration framework”. The IODD unifies the device profile and the communication network profile in one data file. According to the structure defined in ISO 15745, the IODD provides the objects DeviceIdentity and DeviceFunction for the device description. The DeviceIdentity object contains text with information for the user and identification numbers (IDs) to automatically identify sensors and actuators in the plant. The IODD enables the vendor to describe variants of products, which are equal in their parameters, process and diagnosis data and communication but vary in their order number. In this way it is ensured that the high diversity of the mechanical characteristics, which characterize the sensors and actuators, will not result in an unnecessary high number of device descriptions and a high consumption of identification numbers. The DeviceFunction object is the recipient of any other information if these information do not belong to the communication profile. It contains the description of the device’s parameters, process data, diagnosis data and configuration of the user interface.

The embedded communication network profile can be easily replaced and hence the IODD can be easily used to describe sensors and actuators with different communication interfaces.

== Language support ==
The textual data can be specified in multiple languages. In the actual device description only text identifiers are used. Separate text lists (for each supported language one is necessary) link the corresponding language-dependent text to the text identifier. Usually all of the text lists are included in the main file. For subsequent translation into other languages the text lists can be provided as separate files to leave the main file unchanged.

== Standard definition ==
All parameters and diagnosis data, pre-defined by the IO-Link standard, are described in the file"IODD-StandardDefinitions[version].xml" with the same syntax used in the IODD. These default parameters and diagnosis data are not described but referenced in the IODD.

The IODD specification, the IODD guideline with examples and the IODD Checker are provided by the IO-Link Consortium. At present, the IODD version V1.0.1 is available, which describes devices based on the IO-Link specification V1.0 as well as devices based on the IO-Link specification V1.1 in V1.0 compatibility mode. In future, IODD V1.1 will provide a description of devices for the IO-Link specification V1.1. The IODD V1.1 will not replace the V1.0.1.

== IODD Checker ==
The tool "IODD Checker" considers not only the compliance of the schemas but also all the rules of the IODD specification, which can not be checked by the XML schema. After passing the examination the IODD is stamped by the Checker. This test is mandatory. Engineering tools only accept stamped IODDs hence there is no need to implement these tests in the engineering tool.

== IODD Finder ==
The IO-Link community provides interfaces to an "IODD Finder", which can be used by engineering or master tools to present the appropriate IODD for a device.

== See also ==
- IO-Link

== Literature ==
- Joachim R. Uffelmann, Peter Wienzek, Myriam Jahn: IO-Link. The DNA of Industry 4.0. Edition 1. Vulkan-Verlag GmbH, Essen 2018, ISBN 978-3-8356-7390-8.
- Peter Wienzek; Joachim R. Uffelmann, 2010, "IO-Link: intelligente Geräte brauchen einfache Schnittstellen", ISBN 978-3-8356-3115-1
- IO-LINK Verrassende uitkomsten onderzoek naar toepassingsmogelijkheden IO-Link biedt de mogelijkheid om componenten direct vanuit het scada-pakket te configureren. Dat maakt het gebruik van IO-Link bijzonder aantrekkelijk., In: Automatie, ISSN 0005-1128, Bd. 7 (2010)
- PERSPECTIVES - AUTOMATISME - IO-Link donne la parole aux détecteurs - Grâce au standard de communication IO-Link, les détecteurs et actionneurs transmettent leurs données aux systèmes d'automatisme, In: Industrie et technologies, ISSN 1633-7107 (2006), 883, p. 56-57
- IO-Link Sensoren—Innovation mit echtem Mehrwert, In: Automatisierungstechnische Praxis, ISSN 0340-4730, Bd. 50 (2008), 7, p. 26-27
