= Dick Morley =

American inventor (1932–2017)

Richard E. Morley, an inventor who dropped out of MIT, designed a rugged computer that revolutionized factory automation.

Richard E. Morley (December 1, 1932 – October 17, 2017) was an American inventor who was considered one of the "fathers" of the programmable logic controller (PLC). He was involved with the production of the first PLC for General Motors, the Modicon, at Bedford and Associates in 1968. The Modicon brand of PLC is now owned by Schneider Electric. The PLC has been recognized as a significant advancement in the practice of automation, and has an important influence on manufacturing.

== Biography ==
He was born in Clinton, Massachusetts, in 1932 and attended the Massachusetts Institute of Technology but dropped out before graduating.

== Legacy ==
An inventor, machinist, author, and consultant, his peers have acknowledged his contributions with numerous awards from groups such as the International Society of Automation (ISA), the Instrumentation Systems and Automation Society, Inc. magazine, the Franklin Institute, the Society of Manufacturing Engineers (SME) and the Engineering Society of Detroit. He was also inducted into the Manufacturing Hall of Fame.

SME offers the Richard E. Morley Outstanding Young Manufacturing Engineer Award for outstanding technical accomplishments in the manufacturing profession by engineers age 35 and under.

Morley worked out of his barn in New Hampshire where he and his wife had provided a home to 40 foster children. He died on October 17, 2017, in New Hampshire.

== Awards ==
- 2016 Inducted into the Measurement, Control & Automation Hall of Fame by the Measurement, Control & Automation Association (MCAA)
- 2016 Control System Integrators Association (CSIA) Lifetime Achievement Award
- 2007–2008 SME Manufacturing Enterprise Council Member
- 2006–2008 NH Judge - Hi Tech Council Product of the Year
- 2006 Process Automation Hall of Fame (Control magazine)
- 2005 SME Board of Directors
- 1996 Automation Hall of Fame Prometheus Award
- 1995 SME Fellow
- 1993 Parallel Processor Design — Flavors
- 1991 Howard N. Potts Medal
- 1990 Entrepreneur of the Year
- 1981 Gould Science & Engineering Fellow
- Boeing Technical Excellence Award

== See also ==
- Odo Josef Struger
