= Limit switch =

Electric switch type

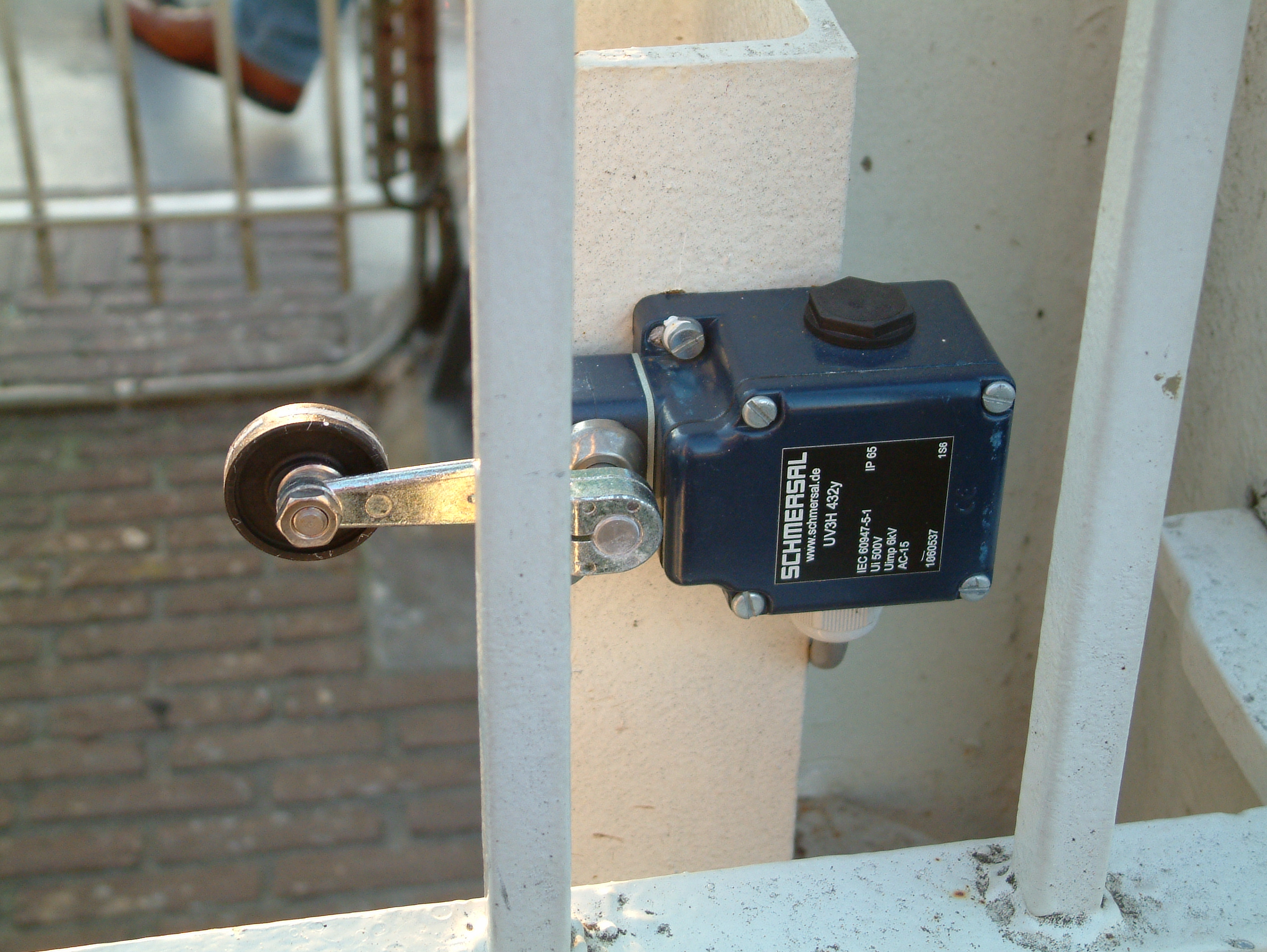
A limit switch with a roller-lever operator; this is installed on a gate on a canal lock, and indicates the position of a gate to a control system

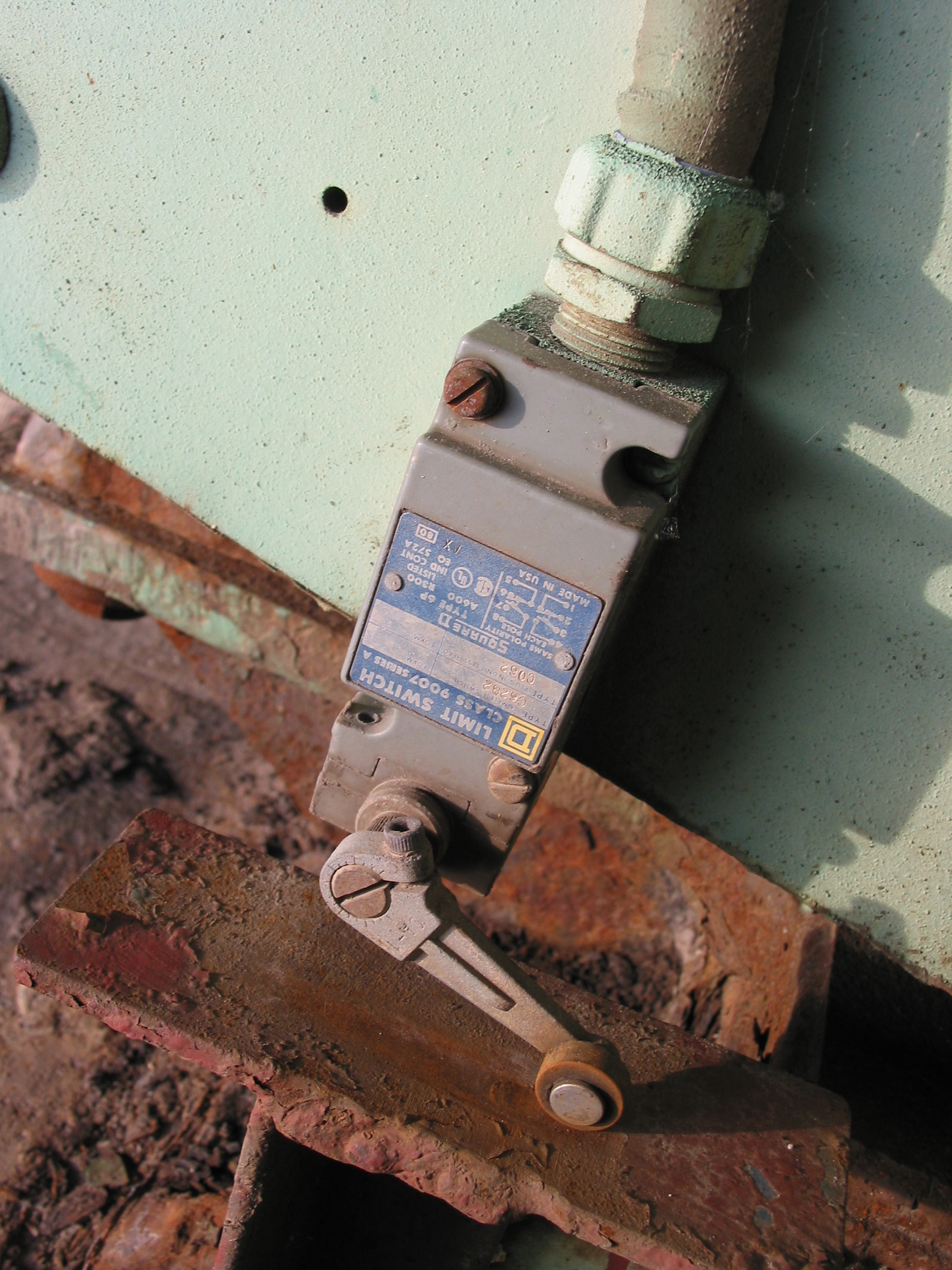
A limit switch mounted on a moving part of a bridge

In electrical engineering, a limit switch is a switch operated by the motion of a machine part or the presence of an object. A limit switch can be used for controlling machinery as part of a control system, as a safety interlock, or as a counter enumerating objects passing a point.

== Uses ==
Limit switches are used in a variety of applications and environments because of their ruggedness, ease of installation, reliability of operation, and relative cost effectiveness. They can determine the presence, passing, positioning, and end of travel of an object. They were first used to define the limit of travel of an object, hence the name "limit switch".

Standardized limit switches are industrial control components manufactured with a variety of operator types, including lever, roller plunger, and whisker type. Limit switches may be directly mechanically operated by the motion of the operating lever. A reed switch may be used to indicate proximity of a magnet mounted on some moving part. Proximity switches operate by the disturbance of an electromagnetic field, by capacitance, or by sensing a magnetic field.

Rarely, a final operating device such as a lamp or solenoid valve is directly controlled by the contacts of an industrial limit switch, but more typically the limit switch is wired through a control relay, a motor contactor control circuit, or as an input to a programmable logic controller. Fail-Safe Wiring: In safety-critical applications, such as end-of-travel stops for industrial actuators or CNC machines, limit switches are typically wired in a Normally Closed (NC) configuration. This creates a fail-safe architecture: if a wire breaks or a connector becomes unplugged, the circuit opens and the machine controller interprets the signal as the limit being reached, causing an immediate stop. Conversely, if a switch were wired Normally Open (NO), a broken wire would result in the signal never changing, potentially allowing the machine to drive through its physical hard stops and cause catastrophic mechanical failure.

== Notation ==
Limit Switches can be represented by either the gravity model, or the arrow model. The gravity model represents limit switches in National Electrical Manufacturers Association (NEMA) and International Electrotechnical Commission (IEC) schematic symbols for all four possible variants of states, being Normally Open Held Open, Normally Closed Held Open, Normally Open Held Closed, and Normally Closed Held Closed. The switch controlled by the Limit Switches follows the natural tendency of gravity when in the deenergized state, hence the name "Gravity Model".

Arrow Notation is used to simplify the Gravity model by representing the energized states in means of arrows, with the arrows demonstrating that the switch is in the open or 'activated' state. Often, there is a paired subscript for further elucidation of the state of the arrow. This subscript follows the form of "LS#" (Limit Switch and the chronological order number within the system), "NO/NC" (Normally Opened or Normally Closed), and "HO/HC" (the power of the state, being Held Open or Held Close).

For instance, consider a limit switch of a circuit that is normally closed, in the held open state, and is labeled as the first in chronological order of the circuit. This limit switch would get the subscript "LS1 NC-HO". Arrow notation allows simpler, and faster representation of a limit switch.

== Examples ==
Miniature snap-action switches are components of devices like photocopiers, computer printers, convertible tops or microwave ovens to ensure internal components are in the correct position for operation and to prevent operation when access doors are opened. A set of adjustable limit switches installed on a garage door opener shut off the motor when the door has reached the fully raised or fully lowered position. A numerical control machine such as a lathe has limit switches to identify maximum limits for machine parts or to provide a known reference point for incremental motions.
