= Birgit Vogel-Heuser =

German computer scientist and professor

Birgit Vogel-Heuser (born 1961) is a German computer scientist and professor at the Technical University of Munich (TUM). She has been cited over 15,000 times. Vogel-Heuser's research focuses on systems and software engineering, and modeling of distributed embedded systems.

She received her engineering degree in 1987 and her doctorate in mechanical engineering in 1990 from the RWTH Aachen University. She was appointed to the Chair of Automation and Information Systems at TUM in 2009.

== Selected research ==
- Hehenberger, Peter, et al. "Design, modelling, simulation and integration of cyber physical systems: Methods and applications." Computers in Industry 82 (2016): 273-289.
- Vogel-Heuser, Birgit, and Dieter Hess. "Guest editorial Industry 4.0–prerequisites and visions." IEEE Transactions on Automation Science and Engineering 13.2 (2016): 411-413.
- Vogel-Heuser, Birgit, et al. "Evolution of software in automated production systems: Challenges and research directions." Journal of Systems and Software 110 (2015): 54-84.
- Vogel-Heuser, Birgit, Daniel Witsch, and Uwe Katzke. "Automatic code generation from a UML model to IEC 61131-3 and system configuration tools." 2005 International Conference on Control and Automation. Vol. 2. IEEE, 2005.
