= IEC 61131-3 =

Industrial standard for programmable logic controllers

IEC 61131-3 is the third part (of 10) of the international standard IEC 61131 for programmable logic controllers. It was first published in December 1993 by the IEC; the current (fourth) edition was published in May 2025.

Part 3 of IEC 61131 deals with basic software architecture and programming languages of the control program within PLC. The current edition defines three graphical and one textual programming language standards:

- Ladder diagram (LD), graphical
- Function block diagram (FBD), graphical
- Structured text (ST), textual
- Sequential function chart (SFC), has elements to organize programs for sequential and parallel control processing, graphical.

Previous editions also included:

- Instruction list (IL), textual. Deprecated in the third edition (2013) and removed in the fourth edition (2025).

== Data types ==
=== Elementary Data Types (basic) ===
- Bit Strings – groups of on/off values
  - BOOL - 1 bit (0,1)
  - BYTE – 8 bit (1 byte)
  - WORD – 16 bit (2 byte)
  - DWORD – 32 bit (4 byte)
  - LWORD – 64 bit (8 byte)
- INTEGER – whole numbers (Considering byte size 8 bits)
  - SINT – signed short integer (1 byte)
  - INT – signed integer (2 byte)
  - DINT – signed double integer (4 byte)
  - LINT – signed long integer (8 byte)
  - USINT – Unsigned short integer (1 byte)
  - UINT – Unsigned integer (2 byte)
  - UDINT – Unsigned double integer (4 byte)
  - ULINT – Unsigned long integer (8 byte)
- REAL – floating point IEC 60559 (same as IEEE 754-2008)
  - REAL – (4 byte)
  - LREAL – (8 byte)

=== Elementary Data Types (Date and Time) ===
Duration literals
Unit	Description
d	Day
h	Hour
m	Minute
s	Second
ms	Millisecond
us	Microsecond
ns	Nanosecond

- Duration
  - TIME – (implementer specific). Literals in the form of T#5m90s15ms
  - LTIME – (8 byte). Literals extend to nanoseconds in the form of T#5m90s15ms542us15ns
- Date
  - DATE – calendar date (implementer specific)
  - LDATE – calendar date (8 byte, nanoseconds since 1970-01-01, restricted to multiple of one day)
- Time of day
  - TIME_OF_DAY / TOD – clock time (implementer specific)
  - LTIME_OF_DAY / LTOD – clock time (8 byte)
- Date and time of Day
  - DATE_AND_TIME / DT – time and date (implementer specific)
  - LDATE_AND_TIME / LDT – time and date (8 byte, nanoseconds since 1970-01-01)

=== Elementary Data Types (Character / Character string) ===
STRING escape sequences
Escape sequence	Produces
$$	$
$'	'
$L	linefeed
$N	newline
$P	page (form feed)
$R	return
$T	tab
$xx	hex value

- Existing
  - CHAR – Single-byte character (1 byte, limited to characters 0 to 255 of ISO/IEC 10646)
  - WCHAR – Double-byte character (2 byte, limited to characters 0 to 65535 of ISO/IEC 10646)
  - STRING – Variable-length single-byte character string. Literals specified with single quote, 'This is a STRING Literal'
  - WSTRING – Variable-length double-byte character string. Literals specified with a double quote, "This is a WSTRING Literal"
- New in version 4 of the standard
  - UCHAR – Single character encoded according to UTF-8
  - USTRING - Variable-length character string in which each character is encoded according to UTF-8

=== Generic Data Types ===
Only available for the input / output/ in-out variables of system-defined Program Organization Units (POUs, see below)

- ANY
- ANY_DERIVED
- ANY_ELEMENTARY
  - ANY_MAGNITUDE
    - ANY_NUM
      - ANY_REAL: LREAL, REAL
      - ANY_INT
        - ANY_UNSIGNED: ULINT, UDINT, UINT, USINT
        - ANY_SIGNED: LINT, DINT, INT, SINT
    - ANY_DURATION: TIME, LTIME
  - ANY_BIT: LWORD, DWORD, WORD, BYTE, BOOL
  - ANY_CHARS
    - ANY_STRING: STRING, WSTRING
    - ANY_CHAR: CHAR, WCHAR
  - ANY_DATE: DATE_AND_TIME (DT), DATE_AND_TIME(LDT), DATE, TIME_OF_DAY (TOD), LTIME_OF_DAY(LTOD)

=== User-defined Data Types ===
- Enumerated data type
- Enumerated data type with named value
- Subrange data type – puts limits on value i.e., INT(4 .. 20) for current
- Array data type – multiple values stored in the same variable.
- Structured data type – composite of several variables and types.
- Directly derived data type – type derived from one of the above types to give new name and initial value as a type.
- References – a kind of strongly typed pointer. Arithmetic operation of the value of this type is prohibited.

== Variables ==
Variable attributes: RETAIN, CONSTANT, AT

- Global
- Direct (local)
- I/O Mapping – Input, Output, I/O
- External
- Temporary

== Configuration ==
- Resource – Like a CPU
- Tasks – Can be multiple per CPU.
- Programs – Can be executed once, on a timer, on an event.

== Program organization unit (POU) ==
- Functions
  - Standard: ADD, SQRT, SIN, COS, GT, MIN, MAX, AND, OR, etc.
  - Custom
- Function Blocks
  - Standard:
  - Custom – Libraries of functions can be supplied by a vendor or third party.
- Programs

== Configuration, resources, tasks ==
- Configuration – processing resources, memory for IO, execution rates, number of tasks.

== Object oriented programming (OOP) ==
- The 3rd revision of the standard describes how to implement OOP within the application programming
