= Instruction list =

Deprecated language for programmable logic controllers

Instruction list (IL) is one of the 5 languages supported by the initial versions of IEC 61131-3 standard, and subsequently deprecated in the third edition.

It is designed for programmable logic controllers (PLCs). It is a low level language and resembles assembly. All of the languages share IEC61131 Common Elements. The variables and function call are defined by the common elements so different languages can be used in the same program.

Program control (control flow) is achieved by jump instructions and function calls (subroutines with optional parameters).

The file format has now been standardized to XML by PLCopen.

== Example ==
          LD     Speed
          GT     2000
          JMPCN  VOLTS_OK
          LD     Volts
 VOLTS_OK LD     1
          ST     %Q75

== Variations from IEC 61131 ==
Many vendors whilst incorporating the full IEC 61131-3 requirements have additional vendor specific calls/function blocks to suit their hardware such as reading or writing to I/O. Siemens PLC instruction list language is known as "Statement List" or "STL" in English, and "Anweisungs-Liste" or "AWL" in German, Italian and Spanish. The user of a Simatic development package may choose between German and International mnemonics to represent instructions. For example, "A" for "AND" or "U" for "UND", "I" for "Input" or "E" for "Eingang".

== See also ==
- 1-bit architecture
