= Structured text =

Programming language for programmable logic controllers

Structured text, abbreviated as ST or STX, is one of the five languages supported by the IEC 61131-3 standard, designed for programmable logic controllers (PLCs). It is a high-level language that is block structured and syntactically resembles Pascal, on which it is based. All of the languages share IEC61131 Common Elements. The variables and function calls are defined by the common elements so different languages within the IEC 61131-3 standard can be used in the same program.

Complex statements and nested instructions are supported:

- Iteration loops (REPEAT-UNTIL; WHILE-DO)
- Conditional execution (IF-THEN-ELSE; CASE)
- Functions (SQRT(), SIN())

== Sample program ==
(* simple state machine *)
TxtState := STATES[StateMachine];

CASE StateMachine OF
   1: ClosingValve();
      StateMachine := 2;
   2: OpeningValve();
ELSE
    BadCase();
END_CASE;

Unlike in some other programming languages, there is no fall through for the CASE statement: the first matching condition is entered, and after running its statements, the CASE block is left without checking other conditions.

=== Additional ST programming examples ===
// PLC configuration
CONFIGURATION DefaultCfg
    VAR_GLOBAL
        b_Start_Stop  : BOOL;         // Global variable to represent a boolean.
        b_ON_OFF      : BOOL;         // Global variable to represent a boolean.
        Start_Stop AT %IX0.0:BOOL;    // Digital input of the PLC (Address 0.0)
        ON_OFF     AT %QX0.0:BOOL;    // Digital output of the PLC (Address 0.0). (Coil)
    END_VAR

    // Schedule the main program to be executed every 20 ms
    TASK Tick(INTERVAL := t#20ms);

    PROGRAM Main WITH Tick : Monitor_Start_Stop;
END_CONFIGURATION

PROGRAM Monitor_Start_Stop          // Actual Program
    VAR_EXTERNAL
        Start_Stop  : BOOL;
        ON_OFF      : BOOL;
    END_VAR
    VAR                             // Temporary variables for logic handling
        ONS_Trig    : BOOL;
        Rising_ONS  : BOOL;
    END_VAR

    // Start of Logic
    // Catch the Rising Edge One Shot of the Start_Stop input
    ONS_Trig    := Start_Stop AND NOT Rising_ONS;
    
    // Main Logic for Run_Contact -- Toggle ON / Toggle OFF ---
    ON_OFF := (ONS_Trig AND NOT ON_OFF) OR (ON_OFF AND NOT ONS_Trig);

    // Rising One Shot logic   
    Rising_ONS := Start_Stop;
END_PROGRAM

==== Function block example ====
//=======================================================================
// Function Block Timed Counter :  Incremental count of the timed interval
//=======================================================================
FUNCTION_BLOCK FB_Timed_Counter
    VAR_INPUT
        Execute         : BOOL := FALSE;        // Trigger signal to begin Timed Counting
        Time_Increment  : REAL := 1.25;         // Enter Cycle Time (Seconds) between counts
        Count_Cycles    : INT  := 20;           // Number of Desired Count Cycles
    END_VAR
    
    VAR_OUTPUT
        Timer_Done_Bit  : BOOL := FALSE;        // One Shot Bit indicating Timer Cycle Done
        Count_Complete  : BOOL := FALSE;        // Output Bit indicating the Count is complete            
        Current_Count   : INT  := 0;            // Accumulating Value of Counter
    END_VAR
    
    VAR
        CycleTimer      : TON;                  // Timer FB from Command Library
        CycleCounter    : CTU;                  // Counter FB from Command Library
        TimerPreset     : TIME;                 // Converted Time_Increment in Seconds to MS
    END_VAR
        
    // Start of Function Block programming
    TimerPreset := REAL_TO_TIME(in := Time_Increment) * 1000;

    CycleTimer(
        in := Execute AND NOT CycleTimer.Q,
        pt := TimerPreset);

    Timer_Done_Bit := CycleTimer.Q;
    
    CycleCounter(
        cu := CycleTimer.Q,
        r := NOT Execute,
        pv := Count_Cycles);

    Current_Count := CycleCounter.cv;
    Count_Complete := CycleCounter.q;
    
END_FUNCTION_BLOCK
